= 1998–99 Tottenham Hotspur F.C. season =

English football club season

Tottenham Hotspur F.C.
1998–99 season
- Chairman: Alan Sugar
- Manager: Christian Gross (until 5 September); Chris Hughton (caretaker from 5–24 September); George Graham (from 24 September)
- Stadium: White Hart Lane
- FA Premier League: 11th
- FA Cup: Semi-final
- League Cup: Winners
- Top goalscorer: League: Steffen Iversen (9); All: Steffen Iversen (13)
- Highest home attendance: 36,125 (vs. Liverpool, 5 December)
- Lowest home attendance: 22,980 (vs. Brentford, 23 September)
- Average home league attendance: 34,149
Home colours	Away colours

During the 1998–99 season, Tottenham Hotspur participated in the FA Premier League.

== Season summary ==
A dismal start to the season saw Christian Gross lose his job as Tottenham manager less than a year after taking over. There were a few raised eyebrows when the job went to George Graham – who had achieved so much success during his reign at Tottenham's deadly rivals Arsenal. But the appointment brought instant success: though Tottenham were unable to progress beyond 11th place in the final Premiership table, they triumphed in the Worthington Cup (while also reaching the FA Cup semi-final) to attain only their second European campaign of the post-Heysel era.

== Final league table ==
Pos	Team	Pld	W	D	L	GF	GA	GD	Pts	Qualification or relegation
9	Middlesbrough	38	12	15	11	48	54	−6	51	
10	Leicester City	38	12	13	13	40	46	−6	49	
11	Tottenham Hotspur	38	11	14	13	47	50	−3	47	Qualification for the UEFA Cup first round (Note: Tottenham Hotspur qualified for the UEFA Cup as League Cup winners.)
12	Sheffield Wednesday	38	13	7	18	41	42	−1	46	
13	Newcastle United	38	11	13	14	48	54	−6	46	Qualification for the UEFA Cup first round (Note: As Manchester United qualified for the Champions League, their UEFA Cup place as FA Cup winners defaulted to Newcastle United, the runners-up.)

Source: Premier League
Rules for classification: 1) points; 2) goal difference; 3) number of goals scored.
Notes:

Results summary

Overall								Home						Away					
Pld	W	D	L	GF	GA	GD	Pts	W	D	L	GF	GA	GD	W	D	L	GF	GA	GD
38	11	14	13	47	50	−3	47	7	7	5	28	26	+2	4	7	8	19	24	−5

Source: 1998-99 FA Premier League table

Results by matchday

Match	1	2	3	4	5	6	7	8	9	10	11	12	13	14	15	16	17	18	19	20	21	22	23	24	25	26	27	28	29	30	31	32	33	34	35	36	37	38
Ground	A	H	A	H	H	A	H	A	A	H	H	A	A	H	A	H	H	A	A	H	A	H	A	H	A	H	H	A	H	H	A	A	A	H	A	H	H	A
Result	L	L	W	W	L	D	D	W	L	W	D	L	D	W	L	W	D	L	D	W	D	D	D	D	D	D	W	L	W	L	D	W	W	L	L	L	D	L
Position	20	19	14	8	12	12	13	11	14	8	9	12	14	10	12	11	10	13	13	12	12	11	11	11	13	12	10	11	10	12	12	10	9	10	10	10	11	11

Source: 11v11.com: 1998-99 Tottenham Hotspur results
A = Away; H = Home; W = Win; D = Draw; L = Loss

== Results ==
Tottenham Hotspur's score comes first

=== Legend ===
Win	Draw	Loss

=== FA Premier League ===
Date	Opponent	Venue	Result	Attendance	Scorers
15 August 1998	Wimbledon	A	1–3	23,031	Fox
22 August 1998	Sheffield Wednesday	H	0–3	32,129	
29 August 1998	Everton	A	1–0	39,378	Ferdinand
9 September 1998	Blackburn Rovers	H	2–1	28,331	Nielsen, Ferdinand
13 September 1998	Middlesbrough	H	0–3	30,345	
19 September 1998	Southampton	A	1–1	15,204	Fox
26 September 1998	Leeds United	H	3–3	35,535	Vega, Iversen, Campbell
3 October 1998	Derby County	A	1–0	30,083	Campbell
19 October 1998	Leicester City	A	1–2	20,787	Ferdinand
24 October 1998	Newcastle United	H	2–0	36,047	Iversen (2)
2 November 1998	Charlton Athletic	H	2–2	32,202	Nielsen, Armstrong
7 November 1998	Aston Villa	A	2–3	39,241	Anderton (pen), Vega
14 November 1998	Arsenal	A	0–0	38,278	
21 November 1998	Nottingham Forest	H	2–0	35,832	Nielsen, Armstrong
28 November 1998	West Ham United	A	1–2	26,044	Armstrong
5 December 1998	Liverpool	H	2–1	36,125	Fox, Carragher (own goal)
12 December 1998	Manchester United	H	2–2	36,097	Campbell (2)
19 December 1998	Chelsea	A	0–2	34,881	
26 December 1998	Coventry City	A	1–1	23,098	Campbell
28 December 1998	Everton	H	4–1	36,053	Ferdinand, Armstrong (3)
9 January 1999	Sheffield Wednesday	A	0–0	28,204	
16 January 1999	Wimbledon	H	0–0	32,422	
30 January 1999	Blackburn Rovers	A	1–1	29,643	Iversen
6 February 1999	Coventry City	H	0–0	34,376	
20 February 1999	Middlesbrough	A	0–0	34,687	
27 February 1999	Derby County	H	1–1	35,392	Sherwood
2 March 1999	Southampton	H	3–0	28,580	Armstrong, Iversen, Dominguez
10 March 1999	Leeds United	A	0–2	34,521	
13 March 1999	Aston Villa	H	1–0	35,963	Sherwood
3 April 1999	Leicester City	H	0–2	35,415	
5 April 1999	Newcastle United	A	1–1	36,655	Anderton (pen)
17 April 1999	Nottingham Forest	A	1–0	25,181	Iversen
20 April 1999	Charlton Athletic	A	4–1	20,043	Iversen, Campbell, Dominguez, Ginola
24 April 1999	West Ham United	H	1–2	36,089	Ginola
1 May 1999	Liverpool	A	2–3	44,007	Carragher (own goal), Iversen
5 May 1999	Arsenal	H	1–3	36,019	Anderton
10 May 1999	Chelsea	H	2–2	35,878	Iversen, Ginola
16 May 1999	Manchester United	A	1–2	55,189	Ferdinand

=== FA Cup ===
Round	Date	Opponent	Venue	Result	Attendance	Goalscorers
R3	2 January 1999	Watford	H	5–2	36,022	Iversen (2), Anderton (pen), Nielsen, Fox
R4	23 January 1999	Wimbledon	A	1–1	22,229	Ginola
R4R	2 February 1999	Wimbledon	H	3–0	24,049	Sinton, Nielsen (2)
R5	13 February 1999	Leeds United	A	1–1	39,696	Sherwood
R5R	24 February 1999	Leeds United	H	2–0	32,307	Anderton, Ginola
QF	16 March 1999	Barnsley	A	1–0	18,793	Ginola
SF	11 April 1999	Newcastle United	N	0–2	53,609	

=== League Cup ===
Round	Date	Opponent	Venue	Result	Attendance	Goalscorers
R2 1st Leg	15 September 1998	Brentford	A	3–2	11,831	Carr, Vega, Dominguez
R2 2nd Leg	23 September 1998	Brentford	H	3–2 (won 6–4 on agg)	22,980	Campbell, Nielsen, Armstrong
R3	27 October 1998	Northampton Town	A	3–1	7,422	Armstrong (2), Campbell
R4	10 November 1998	Liverpool	A	3–1	20,772	Iversen, Scales, Nielsen
QF	2 December 1998	Manchester United	H	3–1	35,702	Armstrong (2), Ginola
SF 1st Leg	27 January 1999	Wimbledon	H	0–0	35,997	
SF 2nd Leg	16 February 1999	Wimbledon	A	1–0 (won 1–0 on agg)	25,204	Iversen
F	21 March 1999	Leicester City	N	1–0	77,892	Nielsen

== First-team squad ==
Squad at end of season

Note: Flags indicate national team as defined under FIFA eligibility rules; some limited exceptions apply. Players may hold more than one non-FIFA nationality.

No.	Pos.	Nation	Player
1	GK	ENG	Ian Walker
2	DF	IRL	Stephen Carr
3	DF	ITA	Paolo Tramezzani
4	MF	GER	Steffen Freund
5	DF	NOR	Roger Nilsen
6	MF	DEN	Allan Nielsen
7	MF	MSR	Ruel Fox
8	MF	ALG	Moussa Saïb
9	MF	ENG	Darren Anderton
10	FW	ENG	Les Ferdinand
11	FW	ENG	Chris Armstrong
12	DF	ENG	Justin Edinburgh
13	GK	NOR	Espen Baardsen
14	MF	FRA	David Ginola
15	DF	SUI	Ramon Vega
16	DF	ENG	Clive Wilson

No.	Pos.	Nation	Player
17	DF	ENG	John Scales
18	FW	NOR	Steffen Iversen
19	DF	ARG	Mauricio Taricco
20	MF	POR	José Dominguez
21	FW	ENG	Rory Allen
22	MF	ENG	Andy Sinton
23	DF	ENG	Sol Campbell (captain)
24	MF	ENG	Tim Sherwood
25	MF	ENG	Stephen Clemence
26	DF	ENG	Ledley King
29	FW	NIR	Paul McVeigh
30	GK	NED	Hans Segers
31	GK	ENG	Simon Brown
32	DF	ENG	Luke Young
33	MF	ENG	Mark Gower
35	DF	ENG	Alton Thelwell

=== Left club during season ===
Note: Flags indicate national team as defined under FIFA eligibility rules; some limited exceptions apply. Players may hold more than one non-FIFA nationality.

No.	Pos.	Nation	Player
4	MF	ITA	Nicola Berti (to Alavés)
5	DF	SCO	Colin Calderwood (to Aston Villa)
24	FW	ENG	Neale Fenn (on loan to Lincoln City)

No.	Pos.	Nation	Player
34	MF	ENG	Peter Gain (to Lincoln City)
-	DF	ENG	Mark Arber (to Barnet)

=== Reserve squad ===
Note: Flags indicate national team as defined under FIFA eligibility rules; some limited exceptions apply. Players may hold more than one non-FIFA nationality.

No.	Pos.	Nation	Player
-	GK	ENG	Alan Marriott
-	DF	IRL	Simon Webb
-	MF	ENG	David Lee
-	MF	ENG	John Piercy

No.	Pos.	Nation	Player
-	MF	ENG	Stuart Thurgood
-	FW	ENG	Peter Crouch
-	FW	ENG	Ian Stonebridge

== Statistics ==
=== Appearances and goals ===
No.	Pos	Nat	Player	Total		FA Premier League		FA Cup		League Cup	
No.	Pos	Nat	Player	Apps	Goals	Apps	Goals	Apps	Goals	Apps	Goals
Goalkeepers
1	GK	(England) ENG	Ian Walker	36	0	25	0	7	0	4	0
13	GK	(Norway) NOR	Espen Baardsen	15	0	12	0	0	0	3	0
30	GK	(Netherlands) NED	Hans Segers	2	0	1	0	0	0	1	0
Defenders
2	DF	(Republic of Ireland) IRL	Stephen Carr	52	1	37	0	7	0	8	1
3	DF	(Italy) ITA	Paolo Tramezzani	7	0	6	0	0	0	1	0
5	DF	(Norway) NOR	Roger Nilsen	2	0	2	0	0	0	0	0
12	DF	(England) ENG	Justin Edinburgh	26	0	14+2	0	4+1	0	5	0
15	DF	(Switzerland) SUI	Ramon Vega	25	3	13+3	2	4	0	5	1
16	DF	(England) ENG	Clive Wilson	1	0	0	0	0	0	0+1	0
17	DF	(England) ENG	John Scales	9	1	7	0	0	0	2	1
19	DF	(Argentina) ARG	Mauricio Taricco	16	0	12+1	0	2+1	0	0	0
23	DF	(England) ENG	Sol Campbell	52	8	37	6	7	0	8	2
26	DF	(England) ENG	Ledley King	1	0	0+1	0	0	0	0	0
32	DF	(England) ENG	Luke Young	22	0	14+1	0	3+2	0	1+1	0
Midfielders
4	MF	(Germany) GER	Steffen Freund	26	0	17	0	6	0	3	0
6	MF	(Denmark) DEN	Allan Nielsen	40	9	25+4	3	2+2	3	7	3
7	MF	(Montserrat) MSR	Ruel Fox	25	4	17+3	3	2	1	1+2	0
8	MF	(Algeria) ALG	Moussa Saib	4	0	0+4	0	0	0	0	0
9	MF	(England) ENG	Darren Anderton	46	5	31+1	3	7	2	7	0
14	MF	(France) FRA	David Ginola	44	7	30	3	6	3	8	1
20	MF	(Portugal) POR	José Dominguez	15	3	2+11	2	0	0	0+2	1
22	MF	(England) ENG	Andy Sinton	34	1	12+10	0	2+4	1	3+3	0
24	MF	(England) ENG	Tim Sherwood	18	3	12+2	2	4	1	0	0
25	MF	(England) ENG	Stephen Clemence	21	0	9+8	0	0+1	0	2+1	0
33	MF	(England) ENG	Mark Gower	2	0	0	0	0	0	0+2	0
Forwards
10	FW	(England) ENG	Les Ferdinand	35	5	22+2	5	6+1	0	2+2	0
11	FW	(England) ENG	Chris Armstrong	44	12	24+10	7	3+2	0	5	5
18	FW	(Norway) NOR	Steffen Iversen	40	13	22+5	9	5+2	2	6	2
21	FW	(England) ENG	Rory Allen	7	0	0+4	0	0	0	1+2	0
Players transferred out during the season
4	MF	(Italy) ITA	Nicola Berti	4	0	4	0	0	0	0	0
5	DF	(Scotland) SCO	Colin Calderwood	17	0	11+1	0	0	0	5	0

Last updated: 15 May 1999
Source: [[]]

=== Goal scorers ===
Last updated: 26 July 2020.
Source: premierleague.com

The list is sorted by shirt number when total goals are equal.

Rnk	Pos	No.	Player	FA Premier League	FA Cup	League Cup	Total
1	FW	18	(Norway) Steffen Iversen	9	2	2	13
2	FW	11	(England) Chris Armstrong	7	0	5	12
3	MF	6	(Denmark) Allan Nielsen	3	3	3	9
4	DF	23	(England) Sol Campbell	6	0	2	8
5	MF	14	(France) David Ginola	3	3	1	7
6	MF	9	(England) Darren Anderton	3	2	0	5
6	FW	10	(England) Les Ferdinand	5	0	0	5
8	DF	6	(Montserrat) Ruel Fox	3	1	0	4
9	DF	15	(Switzerland) Ramon Vega	2	0	1	3
9	MF	20	(Portugal) José Dominguez	2	0	1	3
9	MF	24	(England) Tim Sherwood	2	1	0	3
12	DF	2	(Republic of Ireland) Stephen Carr	0	0	1	1
12	DF	17	(England) John Scales	0	0	1	1
12	MF	22	(England) Andy Sinton	0	1	0	1
TOTALS				45	13	17	75

=== Clean sheets ===
Last updated: 26 July 2020.
Source: premierleague.com

Rnk	No.	Player	FA Premier League	FA Cup	League Cup	Total
1	1	(England) Ian Walker	7	3	3	13
2	13	(Norway) Espen Baardsen	5	0	0	5
TOTALS			12	3	3	18

== Transfers ==
=== In ===
Date	Pos.	Name	From	Fee
29 June 1998	DF	(Italy) Paolo Tramezzani	(Italy) Piacenza	£1,350,000
9 November 1998	DF	(Argentina) Mauricio Taricco	(England) Ipswich Town	£1,775,000
24 December 1998	MF	(Germany) Steffen Freund	(Germany) Borussia Dortmund	£750,000
4 February 1999	MF	(England) Tim Sherwood	(England) Blackburn Rovers	£4,000,000
25 March 1999	DF	(Norway) Roger Nilsen	(England) Sheffield United	Free transfer
17 May 1999	MF	(Netherlands) Willem Korsten	(Netherlands) Vitesse Arnhem	£1,500,000

=== Out ===
Date	Pos.	Name	To	Fee
14 June 1998	MF	(England) David Howells	(England) Southampton	Free transfer
17 June 1998	MF	(England) Danny Hill	(England) Oxford United	Free transfer
1 July 1998	DF	(England) Dean Austin	(England) Crystal Palace	Free transfer
7 July 1998	MF	(Scotland) Garry Brady	(England) Newcastle United	Free transfer
20 November 1998	DF	(England) Mark Arber	(England) Barnet	£75,000
31 December 1998	MF	(Italy) Nicola Berti	(Spain) Alavés	Free transfer
23 March 1999	DF	(Scotland) Colin Calderwood	(England) Aston Villa	£225,000
25 March 1999	MF	(England) Peter Gain	(England) Lincoln City	£15,000
18 May 1999	MF	(England) Ross Fitzsimon	(England) Norwich City	Free transfer

Transfers in: ▼£9,375,000
Transfers out: ▲£315,000
Total spending: ▼£9,060,000
