= 1997–98 Tottenham Hotspur F.C. season =

English football club season

Tottenham Hotspur
1997–98 season
- Chairman: Alan Sugar
- Manager: Gerry Francis (until 19 November); Chris Hughton (caretaker 19–20 November); Christian Gross (from 20 November)
- Stadium: White Hart Lane
- FA Premier League: 14th
- FA Cup: Fourth round
- League Cup: Third round
- Top goalscorer: League: Jürgen Klinsmann (9); All: Jürgen Klinsmann/David Ginola (9)
- Highest home attendance: 35,995 (vs. Southampton, 10 May)
- Lowest home attendance: 19,255 (vs. Carlisle United, 17 September)
- Average home league attendance: 28,306
Home colours	Away colours

During the 1997–98 season, Tottenham Hotspur participated in the FA Premier League, FA Cup, and Football League Cup.

== Season summary ==
Despite the pre-season capture of Newcastle stars David Ginola and Les Ferdinand, Tottenham Hotspur began the season badly and looked nothing like a side who were hoping to challenge for a European place. By the time Gerry Francis resigned in November, Spurs were in the relegation zone and chairman Alan Sugar was the target of more hostility than ever before. Swiss coach Christian Gross was named as Francis's successor, and soon after arriving he brought in former Spurs star Jürgen Klinsmann - who had been so successful and popular during his first spell three seasons earlier.

In the end, Tottenham beat the drop and finished 14th in the final table. Klinsmann retired from playing, to draw the curtain on a brilliant career.

== Final league table ==
Pos	Team	Pld	W	D	L	GF	GA	GD	Pts	Qualification or relegation
12	Southampton	38	14	6	18	50	55	−5	48	
13	Newcastle United	38	11	11	16	35	44	−9	44	Qualification for the Cup Winners' Cup first round (Note: As Arsenal qualified for the Champions League, their Cup Winners' Cup place as FA Cup winners defaulted to Newcastle United, the runners-up.)
14	Tottenham Hotspur	38	11	11	16	44	56	−12	44	
15	Wimbledon	38	10	14	14	34	46	−12	44	
16	Sheffield Wednesday	38	12	8	18	52	67	−15	44	

Source: Premier League
Rules for classification: 1) points; 2) goal difference; 3) number of goals scored.
Notes:

Results summary

Overall								Home						Away					
Pld	W	D	L	GF	GA	GD	Pts	W	D	L	GF	GA	GD	W	D	L	GF	GA	GD
38	11	11	16	44	56	−12	44	7	8	4	23	22	+1	4	3	12	21	34	−13

Source: 1997-98 FA Premier League table

Results by matchday

Match	1	2	3	4	5	6	7	8	9	10	11	12	13	14	15	16	17	18	19	20	21	22	23	24	25	26	27	28	29	30	31	32	33	34	35	36	37	38
Ground	H	A	H	H	A	A	H	H	H	A	H	A	H	A	H	A	H	A	H	A	H	A	H	A	A	H	A	H	A	H	A	H	A	H	A	H	A	H
Result	L	L	W	W	D	L	D	D	D	L	W	L	L	L	L	W	L	L	W	L	D	L	W	L	W	D	L	W	L	D	W	D	L	D	D	W	W	D
Position	20	19	13	9	7	9	12	11	13	14	11	14	15	16	17	17	18	18	18	18	19	19	18	18	17	17	17	17	17	17	16	16	17	17	17	16	15	14

Source: 11v11.com: 1997-98 Tottenham Hotspur results
A = Away; H = Home; W = Win; D = Draw; L = Loss

== Results ==
Tottenham Hotspur's score comes first

=== Legend ===
Win	Draw	Loss

=== FA Premier League ===
Date	Opponent	Venue	Result	Attendance	Scorers
10 August 1997	Manchester United	H	0–2	26,359	
13 August 1997	West Ham United	A	1–2	25,354	Ferdinand
23 August 1997	Derby County	H	1–0	25,886	Calderwood
27 August 1997	Aston Villa	H	3–2	26,317	Ferdinand (2), Fox
30 August 1997	Arsenal	A	0–0	38,102	
13 September 1997	Leicester City	A	0–3	20,683	
20 September 1997	Blackburn Rovers	H	0–0	26,573	
23 September 1997	Bolton Wanderers	A	1–1	23,433	Armstrong
27 September 1997	Wimbledon	H	0–0	26,261	
4 October 1997	Newcastle United	A	0–1	36,709	
19 October 1997	Sheffield Wednesday	H	3–2	25,097	Dominguez, Armstrong, Ginola
25 October 1997	Southampton	A	2–3	15,255	Dominguez, Ginola
1 November 1997	Leeds United	H	0–1	26,441	
8 November 1997	Liverpool	A	0–4	38,006	
24 November 1997	Crystal Palace	H	0–1	25,634	
29 November 1997	Everton	A	2–0	36,670	Vega, Ginola
6 December 1997	Chelsea	H	1–6	28,476	Vega
13 December 1997	Coventry City	A	0–4	19,499	
20 December 1997	Barnsley	H	3–0	28,232	Nielsen (2), Ginola
26 December 1997	Aston Villa	A	1–4	38,644	Calderwood
28 December 1997	Arsenal	H	1–1	29,610	Nielsen
10 January 1998	Manchester United	A	0–2	55,281	
17 January 1998	West Ham United	H	1–0	30,284	Klinsmann
31 January 1998	Derby County	A	1–2	30,187	Fox
7 February 1998	Blackburn Rovers	A	3–0	30,388	Berti, Armstrong, Fox
14 February 1998	Leicester City	H	1–1	28,355	Calderwood
21 February 1998	Sheffield Wednesday	A	0–1	29,871	
1 March 1998	Bolton Wanderers	H	1–0	29,032	Nielsen
4 March 1998	Leeds United	A	0–1	31,394	
14 March 1998	Liverpool	H	3–3	30,245	Klinsmann, Ginola, Vega
28 March 1998	Crystal Palace	A	3–1	26,116	Berti, Armstrong, Klinsmann
4 April 1998	Everton	H	1–1	35,624	Armstrong
11 April 1998	Chelsea	A	0–2	34,149	
13 April 1998	Coventry City	H	1–1	33,463	Berti
18 April 1998	Barnsley	A	1–1	18,692	Calderwood
25 April 1998	Newcastle United	H	2–0	35,847	Klinsmann, Ferdinand
2 May 1998	Wimbledon	A	6–2	25,820	Ferdinand, Klinsmann (4), Saïb
10 May 1998	Southampton	H	1–1	35,995	Klinsmann

=== FA Cup ===
Round	Date	Opponent	Venue	Result	Attendance	Goalscorers
R3	5 January 1998	Fulham	H	3–1	27,909	Clemence, Calderwood, Taylor (own goal)
R4	24 January 1998	Barnsley	H	1–1	28,722	Campbell
R4R	4 February 1998	Barnsley	A	1–3	18,220	Ginola

=== League Cup ===
Round	Date	Opponent	Venue	Result	Attendance	Goalscorers
R2 1st Leg	17 September 1997	Carlisle United	H	3–2	19,255	Fenn, Fox, Mahorn
R2 2nd Leg	30 September 1997	Carlisle United	A	2–0 (won 5–2 on agg)	13,571	Ginola (pen), Armstrong
R3	15 October 1997	Derby County	H	1–2	20,390	Ginola

== Squad ==
Note: Flags indicate national team as defined under FIFA eligibility rules; some limited exceptions apply. Players may hold more than one non-FIFA nationality.

No.	Pos.	Nation	Player
1	GK	ENG	Ian Walker
2	DF	ENG	Dean Austin
3	DF	ENG	Justin Edinburgh
4	MF	ENG	David Howells
5	DF	SCO	Colin Calderwood (vice-captain)
6	DF	ENG	Gary Mabbutt (captain)
7	MF	MSR	Ruel Fox
8	MF	DEN	Allan Nielsen
9	MF	ENG	Darren Anderton
10	FW	ENG	Les Ferdinand
11	FW	ENG	Chris Armstrong
12	DF	IRL	Stephen Carr
13	GK	NOR	Espen Baardsen
14	MF	FRA	David Ginola
15	DF	SUI	Ramon Vega
16	DF	ENG	Clive Wilson
17	DF	ENG	John Scales

No.	Pos.	Nation	Player
18	FW	NOR	Steffen Iversen
20	MF	POR	José Dominguez
21	FW	ENG	Rory Allen
22	MF	ENG	Andy Sinton
23	DF	ENG	Sol Campbell
24	FW	IRL	Neale Fenn
25	MF	ENG	Stephen Clemence
26	FW	NIR	Paul McVeigh
27	MF	ENG	Danny Hill
29	DF	ENG	Mark Arber
31	GK	ENG	Simon Brown
32	MF	SCO	Garry Brady
33	FW	GER	Jürgen Klinsmann
34	MF	ALG	Moussa Saïb
35	MF	ITA	Nicola Berti
36	GK	NOR	Frode Grodås
37	MF	IRL	Peter Gain

=== Left club during season ===
Note: Flags indicate national team as defined under FIFA eligibility rules; some limited exceptions apply. Players may hold more than one non-FIFA nationality.

No.	Pos.	Nation	Player
19	DF	ENG	Stuart Nethercott (to Millwall)
28	DF	ENG	Jamie Clapham (to Ipswich Town)

No.	Pos.	Nation	Player
30	FW	ENG	Paul Mahorn (to Port Vale)
-	MF	IRL	Kevin Maher (to Southend United)

=== Reserve squad ===
Note: Flags indicate national team as defined under FIFA eligibility rules; some limited exceptions apply. Players may hold more than one non-FIFA nationality.

No.	Pos.	Nation	Player
-	GK	ENG	Alan Marriott
-	DF	ENG	Luke Young

No.	Pos.	Nation	Player
-	MF	ENG	Jason Dozzell
-	MF	ENG	Mark Gower

== Transfers ==
=== In ===
Date	Pos	Name	From	Fee
15 July 1997	MF	(France) David Ginola	(England) Newcastle United	£2,000,000
28 July 1997	FW	(England) Les Ferdinand	(England) Newcastle United	£6,000,000
8 August 1997	MF	(Portugal) José Dominguez	(Portugal) Sporting CP	£1,600,000
28 December 1997	FW	(Germany) Jürgen Klinsmann	(Italy) Sampdoria	Free transfer
8 January 1998	MF	(Italy) Nicola Berti	(Italy) Inter Milan	Free transfer
30 January 1998	GK	(Norway) Frode Grodås	(England) Chelsea	£250,000
23 February 1998	MF	(Algeria) Moussa Saïb	(Spain) Valencia	£2,300,000

=== Out ===
Date	Pos	Name	To	Fee
27 June 1997	FW	(England) Teddy Sheringham	(England) Manchester United	£3,500,000
1 August 1997	MF	(England) Simon Wormull	(England) Brentford	Free transfer
10 August 1997	FW	(Israel) Ronny Rosenthal	(England) Watford	Free transfer
19 September 1997	DF	(England) Leon Townley	(England) Brentford	£55,000
23 January 1998	MF	(Republic of Ireland) Kevin Maher	(England) Southend United	Free transfer
13 March 1998	DF	(England) Jamie Clapham	(England) Ipswich Town	£300,000
20 March 1998	FW	(England) Paul Mahorn	(England) Port Vale	Non-contract

Transfers in: ▼£12,150,000
Transfers out: ▲£3,855,000
Total spending: ▼£8,295,000

== Statistics ==
=== Appearances and goals ===
No.	Pos	Nat	Player	Total		FA Premier League		FA Cup		League Cup	
No.	Pos	Nat	Player	Apps	Goals	Apps	Goals	Apps	Goals	Apps	Goals
Goalkeepers
1	GK	(England) ENG	Ian Walker	33	0	29	0	1	0	3	0
13	GK	(Norway) NOR	Espen Baardsen	12	0	9	0	2+1	0	0	0
Defenders
3	DF	(England) ENG	Justin Edinburgh	18	0	13+3	0	0	0	2	0
5	DF	(Scotland) SCO	Colin Calderwood	30	5	21+5	4	1+1	1	1+1	0
6	DF	(England) ENG	Gary Mabbutt	12	0	8+3	0	0	0	1	0
12	DF	(Republic of Ireland) IRL	Stephen Carr	43	0	37+1	0	3	0	2	0
15	DF	(Switzerland) SUI	Ramon Vega	30	3	22+3	3	3	0	2	0
16	DF	(England) ENG	Clive Wilson	19	0	16	0	3	0	0	0
17	DF	(England) ENG	John Scales	12	0	9+1	0	0	0	2	0
23	DF	(England) ENG	Sol Campbell	40	1	34	0	3	1	3	0
Midfielders
4	MF	(England) ENG	David Howells	22	0	14+6	0	0+1	0	1	0
7	MF	(Montserrat) MSR	Ruel Fox	37	4	32	3	2	0	3	1
8	MF	(Denmark) DEN	Allan Nielsen	27	3	21+5	3	0	0	1	0
9	MF	(England) ENG	Darren Anderton	15	0	7+8	0	0	0	0	0
14	MF	(France) FRA	David Ginola	40	9	34	6	3	1	3	2
20	MF	(Portugal) POR	José Dominguez	22	2	8+10	2	1	0	2+1	0
22	MF	(England) ENG	Andy Sinton	21	0	14+5	0	1	0	1	0
25	MF	(England) ENG	Stephen Clemence	21	1	12+5	0	2	1	2	0
32	MF	(Scotland) SCO	Garry Brady	11	0	0+9	0	1+1	0	0	0
34	MF	(Algeria) ALG	Moussa Saib	9	1	3+6	1	0	0	0	0
35	MF	(Italy) ITA	Nicola Berti	19	3	17	3	2	0	0	0
Forwards
10	FW	(England) ENG	Les Ferdinand	24	5	19+2	5	2	0	1	0
11	FW	(England) ENG	Chris Armstrong	22	6	13+6	5	0+1	0	2	1
18	FW	(Norway) NOR	Steffen Iversen	13	0	8+5	0	0	0	0	0
21	FW	(England) ENG	Rory Allen	4	0	1+3	0	0	0	0	0
24	FW	(Republic of Ireland) IRL	Neale Fenn	5	1	0+4	0	0	0	1	1
33	FW	(Germany) GER	Jürgen Klinsmann	18	9	15	9	3	0	0	0
Players transferred out during the season
30	MF	(England) ENG	Paul Mahorn	4	1	2	0	0+1	0	0+1	1

Last updated: 15 May 1999

=== Goal scorers ===
Last updated: 26 July 2020.
Source: premierleague.com

The list is sorted by shirt number when total goals are equal.

Rnk	Pos	No.	Player	FA Premier League	FA Cup	League Cup	Total
1	MF	14	(France) David Ginola	6	1	2	9
1	FW	33	(Germany) Jürgen Klinsmann	9	0	0	9
3	FW	11	(England) Chris Armstrong	5	0	1	6
4	DF	5	(Scotland) Colin Calderwood	4	1	0	5
4	FW	10	(England) Les Ferdinand	5	0	0	5
6	MF	7	(Montserrat) Ruel Fox	3	0	1	4
7	MF	8	(Denmark) Allan Nielsen	3	0	0	3
7	DF	15	(Switzerland) Ramon Vega	3	0	0	3
7	MF	35	(Italy) Nicola Berti	3	0	0	3
10	MF	20	(Portugal) José Dominguez	2	0	0	2
11	DF	23	(England) Sol Campbell	0	1	0	1
11	FW	24	(Republic of Ireland) Neale Fenn	0	0	1	1
11	MF	25	(England) Stephen Clemence	0	1	0	1
11	FW	30	(England) Paul Mahorn	0	0	1	1
11	MF	34	(Algeria) Moussa Saib	1	0	0	1
TOTALS				44	4	6	54

=== Clean sheets ===
Last updated: 26 July 2020.
Source: premierleague.com

Rnk	No.	Player	FA Premier League	FA Cup	League Cup	Total
1	1	(England) Ian Walker	7	0	1	8
2	13	(Norway) Espen Baardsen	3	1	0	4
TOTALS			10	1	1	12
