= 1996–97 Tottenham Hotspur F.C. season =

English football club season

Tottenham Hotspur
1996–97 season
- Chairman: Alan Sugar
- Manager: Gerry Francis
- Stadium: White Hart Lane
- FA Premier League: 10th
- FA Cup: Third round
- League Cup: Fourth round
- Top goalscorer: League: Teddy Sheringham (7); All: Teddy Sheringham (8)
- Highest home attendance: 33,040 vs Leeds United (15 March 1997, FA Premier League)
- Lowest home attendance: 20,080 vs Preston North End (25 September 1996, League Cup)
- Average home league attendance: 31,067a
Home colours	Away colours	Third colours

During the 1996–97 season, Tottenham Hotspur participated in the FA Premier League.

== Season summary ==
For two seasons running, Tottenham narrowly missed out on a UEFA Cup place. 1996–97 could have been the season when Gerry Francis finally got it right and secured either a top-five finish or victory in one of the cups, but early exits from the FA Cup and Coca-Cola Cup ended their chances of a Wembley final, and a 10th-place finish in the final table was the club's lowest since Francis took over in November 1994. This disappointment saw the manager's future thrown into serious doubt, with fans calling for him to be dismissed.

== Final league table ==
Pos	Team	Pld	W	D	L	GF	GA	GD	Pts	Qualification or relegation
8	Wimbledon	38	15	11	12	49	46	+3	56	
9	Leicester City	38	12	11	15	46	54	−8	47	Qualification for the UEFA Cup first round (Note: Leicester City qualified for the UEFA Cup as League Cup winners.)
10	Tottenham Hotspur	38	13	7	18	44	51	−7	46	
11	Leeds United	38	11	13	14	28	38	−10	46	
12	Derby County	38	11	13	14	45	58	−13	46	

Source: Premier League
Rules for classification: 1) points; 2) goal difference; 3) number of goals scored.
Notes:

Results summary

Overall								Home						Away					
Pld	W	D	L	GF	GA	GD	Pts	W	D	L	GF	GA	GD	W	D	L	GF	GA	GD
38	13	7	18	44	51	−7	46	8	4	7	19	17	+2	5	3	11	25	34	−9

Source: Statto

Results by matchday

Match	1	2	3	4	5	6	7	8	9	10	11	12	13	14	15	16	17	18	19	20	21	22	23	24	25	26	27	28	29	30	31	32	33	34	35	36	37	38
Ground	A	H	H	A	H	A	H	A	H	A	A	H	H	A	H	A	A	H	H	A	H	A	H	H	H	A	H	A	H	A	A	H	A	A	A	H	A	H
Result	W	D	D	L	L	W	L	L	W	W	L	W	W	L	L	W	D	D	W	L	L	L	W	L	D	L	L	W	W	D	L	W	L	L	D	W	L	L
Position	3	6	8	12	13	11	12	14	11	8	9	8	7	9	11	10	9	10	9	10	10	10	9	10	9	11	12	10	10	10	10	9	9	9	9	9	9	10

Source: Statto.com
A = Away; H = Home; W = Win; D = Draw; L = Loss

== Results ==
Tottenham Hotspur's score comes first

=== Legend ===
Win	Draw	Loss

=== FA Premier League ===
Date	Opponent	Venue	Result	Attendance	Scorers
17 August 1996	Blackburn Rovers	A	2–0	26,960	Armstrong (2)
21 August 1996	Derby County	H	1–1	28,219	Sheringham
24 August 1996	Everton	H	0–0	29,669	
4 September 1996	Wimbledon	A	0–1	17,306	
7 September 1996	Newcastle United	H	1–2	32,594	Allen
14 September 1996	Southampton	A	1–0	15,251	Armstrong (pen)
22 September 1996	Leicester City	H	1–2	24,159	Wilson (pen)
29 September 1996	Manchester United	A	0–2	54,943	
12 October 1996	Aston Villa	H	1–0	32,840	Nielsen
19 October 1996	Middlesbrough	A	3–0	30,215	Sheringham (2), Fox
26 October 1996	Chelsea	A	1–3	28,318	Armstrong
2 November 1996	West Ham United	H	1–0	32,975	Armstrong
16 November 1996	Sunderland	H	2–0	31,867	Sinton, Sheringham
24 November 1996	Arsenal	A	1–3	38,264	Sinton
2 December 1996	Liverpool	H	0–2	32,899	
7 December 1996	Coventry City	A	2–1	19,656	Sheringham, Sinton
14 December 1996	Leeds United	A	0–0	33,783	
21 December 1996	Sheffield Wednesday	H	1–1	30,996	Nielsen
26 December 1996	Southampton	H	3–1	30,549	Iversen (2), Nielsen
28 December 1996	Newcastle United	A	1–7	36,308	Nielsen
12 January 1997	Manchester United	H	1–2	33,026	Allen
19 January 1997	Nottingham Forest	A	1–2	27,303	Sinton
29 January 1997	Blackburn Rovers	H	2–1	22,943	Iversen, Sinton
1 February 1997	Chelsea	H	1–2	33,027	Howells
15 February 1997	Arsenal	H	0–0	33,039	
24 February 1997	West Ham United	A	3–4	23,998	Sheringham, Anderton, Howells
1 March 1997	Nottingham Forest	H	0–1	32,805	
4 March 1997	Sunderland	A	4–0	20,729	Iversen (3), Nielsen
15 March 1997	Leeds United	H	1–0	33,040	Anderton
19 March 1997	Leicester City	A	1–1	20,563	Sheringham
22 March 1997	Derby County	A	2–4	18,083	Rosenthal, Dozzell
5 April 1997	Wimbledon	H	1–0	32,654	Dozzell
9 April 1997	Sheffield Wednesday	A	1–2	22,671	Nielsen
12 April 1997	Everton	A	0–1	36,380	
19 April 1997	Aston Villa	A	1–1	39,339	Vega
24 April 1997	Middlesbrough	H	1–0	29,940	Sinton
3 May 1997	Liverpool	A	1–2	40,003	Anderton
11 May 1997	Coventry City	H	1–2	33,029	McVeigh

=== FA Cup ===
Round	Date	Opponent	Venue	Result	Attendance	Goalscorers
R3	5 January 1997	Manchester United	A	0–2	52,495	

=== League Cup ===
Round	Date	Opponent	Venue	Result	Attendance	Goalscorers
R2 1st Leg	17 September 1996	Preston North End	A	1–1	16,258	Anderton
R2 2nd Leg	25 September 1996	Preston North End	H	3–0 (won 4–1 on agg)	20,080	Anderton, Allen (2)
R3	23 October 1996	Sunderland	H	2–1	24,867	Armstrong, Campbell
R4	27 November 1996	Bolton Wanderers	A	1–6	18,621	Sheringham

== Squad ==
Note: Flags indicate national team as defined under FIFA eligibility rules; some limited exceptions apply. Players may hold more than one non-FIFA nationality.

No.	Pos.	Nation	Player
1	GK	ENG	Ian Walker
2	DF	ENG	Dean Austin
3	DF	ENG	Justin Edinburgh
4	MF	ENG	David Howells
5	DF	SCO	Colin Calderwood
6	DF	ENG	Gary Mabbutt (captain)
7	MF	MSR	Ruel Fox
8	MF	DEN	Allan Nielsen
9	MF	ENG	Darren Anderton
10	FW	ENG	Teddy Sheringham
11	FW	ENG	Chris Armstrong
12	MF	ENG	Jason Dozzell
13	GK	NOR	Espen Baardsen
14	MF	ENG	Stuart Nethercott
15	DF	ENG	Clive Wilson
16	FW	ISR	Ronny Rosenthal
17	DF	ENG	John Scales

No.	Pos.	Nation	Player
18	FW	NOR	Steffen Iversen
19	MF	NIR	Paul McVeigh
20	FW	IRL	Neale Fenn
21	MF	ENG	Danny Hill
22	DF	ENG	David Kerslake (on loan to Swindon Town)
23	DF	ENG	Sol Campbell
24	DF	SUI	Ramon Vega
25	DF	IRL	Stephen Carr
26	FW	ENG	Paul Mahorn
27	MF	ENG	Andy Sinton
28	DF	ENG	Jamie Clapham
29	FW	ENG	Rory Allen
30	MF	IRL	Simon Webb
31	GK	ENG	Simon Brown
32	MF	SCO	Garry Brady
34	DF	ENG	Mark Arber

=== Left club during season ===
Note: Flags indicate national team as defined under FIFA eligibility rules; some limited exceptions apply. Players may hold more than one non-FIFA nationality.

No.	Pos.	Nation	Player
17	MF	IRL	Andy Turner (to Portsmouth)
18	MF	NIR	Gerry McMahon (to Stoke City)

No.	Pos.	Nation	Player
19	DF	ENG	Kevin Scott (to Norwich City)
24	DF	ENG	Jason Cundy (to Ipswich Town)

=== Reserve squad ===
Note: Flags indicate national team as defined under FIFA eligibility rules; some limited exceptions apply. Players may hold more than one non-FIFA nationality.

No.	Pos.	Nation	Player
-	MF	ENG	Stephen Clemence
-	MF	IRL	Peter Gain
-	MF	ENG	Mark Gower

No.	Pos.	Nation	Player
-	MF	ENG	Simon Spencer
-	MF	ENG	Simon Wormull

== Coaching staff ==
Position	Staff
Manager	(England) Gerry Francis
Assistant manager	(Republic of Ireland) Chris Hughton

== Statistics ==
=== Appearances and goals ===
No.	Pos	Nat	Player	Total		FA Premier League		FA Cup		League Cup	
No.	Pos	Nat	Player	Apps	Goals	Apps	Goals	Apps	Goals	Apps	Goals
Goalkeepers
1	GK	(England) ENG	Ian Walker	42	0	37	0	1	0	4	0
13	GK	(Norway) NOR	Espen Baardsen	2	0	1+1	0	0	0	0	0
Defenders
2	DF	(England) ENG	Dean Austin	16	0	13+2	0	1	0	0	0
3	DF	(England) ENG	Justin Edinburgh	27	0	21+3	0	1	0	2	0
5	DF	(Scotland) SCO	Colin Calderwood	39	0	33+1	0	1	0	4	0
6	DF	(England) ENG	Gary Mabbutt	1	0	1	0	0	0	0	0
14	DF	(England) ENG	Stuart Nethercott	9	0	2+7	0	0	0	0	0
15	DF	(England) ENG	Clive Wilson	30	1	23+3	1	0	0	4	0
17	DF	(England) ENG	John Scales	12	0	10+2	0	0	0	0	0
23	DF	(England) ENG	Sol Campbell	43	1	38	0	1	0	4	1
24	DF	(Switzerland) SUI	Ramon Vega	8	1	8	1	0	0	0	0
25	DF	(Republic of Ireland) IRL	Stephen Carr	30	0	24+2	0	1	0	3	0
28	DF	(England) ENG	Jamie Clapham	1	0	0+1	0	0	0	0	0
Midfielders
4	MF	(England) ENG	David Howells	37	2	32	2	1	0	4	0
7	MF	(Montserrat) MSR	Ruel Fox	29	1	19+6	1	0	0	3+1	0
8	MF	(Denmark) DEN	Allan Nielsen	33	6	28+1	6	1	0	2+1	0
9	MF	(England) ENG	Darren Anderton	18	5	14+1	3	0	0	3	2
12	MF	(England) ENG	Jason Dozzell	18	2	10+7	2	0	0	1	0
27	MF	(England) ENG	Andy Sinton	36	6	32+1	6	1	0	2	0
Forwards
10	FW	(England) ENG	Teddy Sheringham	32	8	29	7	0	0	3	1
11	FW	(England) ENG	Chris Armstrong	15	6	12	5	0	0	3	1
16	FW	(Israel) ISR	Ronny Rosenthal	20	1	4+16	1	0	0	0	0
18	FW	(Norway) NOR	Steffen Iversen	16	6	16	6	0	0	0	0
19	FW	(Northern Ireland) NIR	Paul McVeigh	3	1	2+1	1	0	0	0	0
20	FW	(Republic of Ireland) IRL	Neale Fenn	5	0	0+4	0	1	0	0	0
29	FW	(England) ENG	Rory Allen	16	4	9+3	2	1	0	2+1	2

Last updated: 15 May 1999
Source: [[]]

=== Goal scorers ===
Last updated: 26 July 2020.
Source: premierleague.com

The list is sorted by shirt number when total goals are equal.

Rnk	Pos	No.	Player	FA Premier League	FA Cup	EFL Cup	Total
1	FW	10	(England) Teddy Sheringham	7	0	1	8
2	MF	8	(Denmark) Allan Nielsen	6	0	0	6
2	FW	11	(England) Chris Armstrong	5	0	1	6
2	FW	18	(Norway) Steffen Iversen	6	0	0	6
2	MF	22	(England) Andy Sinton	6	0	0	6
6	MF	9	(England) Darren Anderton	3	0	2	5
7	FW	29	(England) Rory Allen	2	0	2	4
8	MF	4	(England) David Howells	2	0	0	2
8	MF	12	(England) Jason Dozzell	2	0	0	2
10	MF	7	(Montserrat) Ruel Fox	1	0	0	1
10	DF	15	(England) Clive Wilson	1	0	0	1
10	FW	16	(Israel) Ronny Rosenthal	1	0	0	1
10	FW	19	(Northern Ireland) Paul McVeigh	1	0	0	1
10	DF	23	(England) Sol Campbell	0	0	1	1
10	DF	24	(Switzerland) Ramon Vega	1	0	0	1
TOTALS				44	0	7	51

=== Clean sheets ===
Last updated: 26 July 2020.
Source: premierleague.com

Rnk	No.	Player	FA Premier League	FA Cup	EFL Cup	Total
1	1	(England) Ian Walker	13	0	1	14
2	13	(Norway) Espen Baardsen	1	0	0	1
TOTALS			14	0	1	15
