= Stephen Clemence =

English footballer

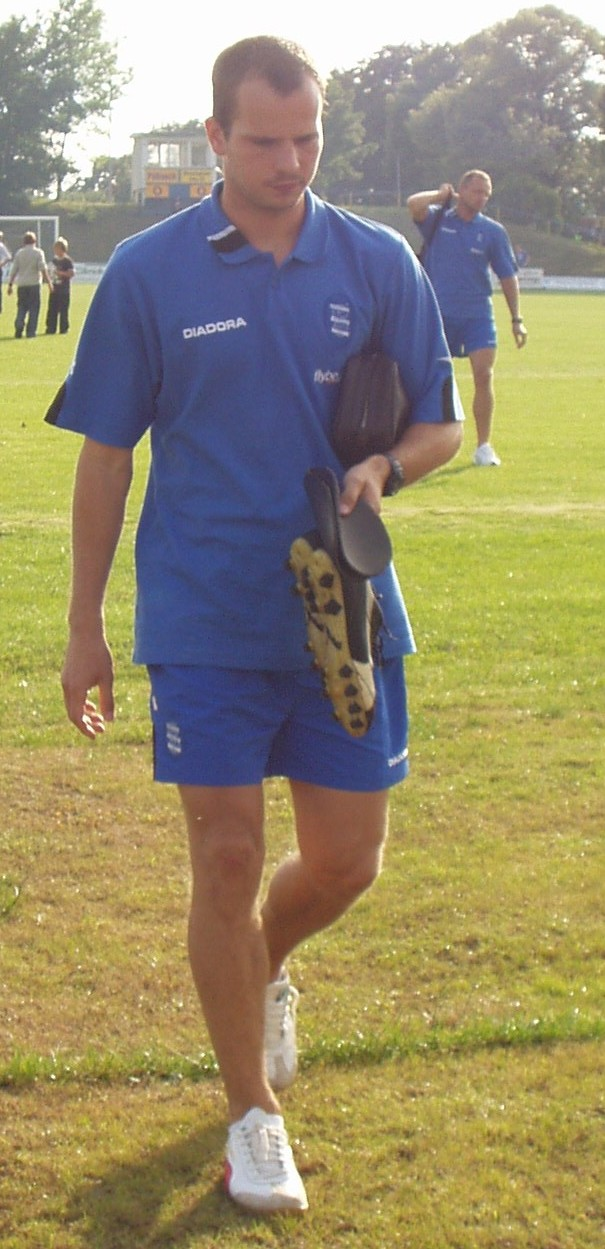
- Pictured in 2004 pre-season

Personal information
- Full name: Stephen Neal Clemence
- Date of birth: 31 March 1978 (age 48)
- Place of birth: Liverpool, England
- Height: 5 ft 11 in (1.80 m)
- Position: Midfielder

Youth career
- 1994–1997: Tottenham Hotspur

Senior career*
Years	Team	Apps	(Gls)
1997–2003	Tottenham Hotspur	91	(2)
2003–2007	Birmingham City	121	(8)
2007–2010	Leicester City	31	(2)
Total		243	(12)

International career
1995–1996	England U18	7	(2)
1998	England U21	1	(0)

Managerial career
- 2019: Sheffield Wednesday (caretaker)
- 2023–2024: Gillingham
- 2024–2025: Barrow
- * Club domestic league appearances and goals

Stephen Neal Clemence (born 31 March 1978) is an English football coach and former player who made nearly 250 appearances in the Premier League and Football League playing as a midfielder.

Clemence began his career with Tottenham Hotspur, where he spent six years as a professional but never established himself as a regular first-team player. He was capped once for England at under-21 level. He moved on to Birmingham City in 2003, where he was chosen player of the 2006–07 season, at the end of which he signed for Leicester City. Clemence was well known for his passion, drive, leadership and commitment on the pitch.

After retirement Clemence joined the coaching staff at Sunderland before moving to Hull City as reserve-team manager and as first-team coach, and continued to follow Steve Bruce to Aston Villa, Sheffield Wednesday, Newcastle United and West Bromwich Albion as first-team coach or assistant manager. He was caretaker manager of Sheffield Wednesday in 2019 and later managed Gillingham and Barrow in his own right.

== Club career ==
=== Tottenham Hotspur ===
The first team Clemence played for was Tottenham Hotspur, for whom he made his debut against Manchester United on 10 August 1997, a match Tottenham lost 2–0. His season was cut much shorter by a four-day spell in February 1998, during which time Clemence picked up a red card against Barnsley. He involved himself to a greater degree the following season, displaying more of the form which won him a place in the England U21 side. He scored three times during his spell at Spurs, his first coming in the 1997–98 FA Cup against Fulham, followed by two league goals against Derby County and Sunderland. Despite not being part of Tottenham's squad for the 1999 Football League Cup Final he made three appearances during their victorious League Cup campaign.

Clemence's injury woes started when he suffered a torn medial ligament in his left knee, following a collision with Blackburn Rovers midfielder Garry Flitcroft in a match at Ewood Park in August 2001. His injury required surgery and was thought he would be out for three months. However, despite clocking up a few hours of football in the reserves, he played only three first-team matches at the end of the 2001–02 season. Further injuries prevented his returning to training until October 2002. In what turned out to be his last season at Tottenham, Clemence played only once, in a 2–1 League Cup defeat to Burnley on 6 November 2002, in which he picked up a calf injury.

=== Birmingham City ===
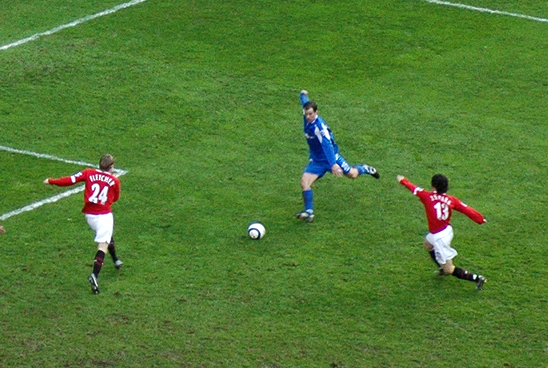
Clemence takes a shot at goal for Birmingham City against Manchester United on 25 March 2006.

When Clemence recovered from the calf injury, Luton Town manager Joe Kinnear had expressed interest in signing him on loan, but when the transfer window opened in January 2003, Premier League newcomers Birmingham City agreed a fee, believed to be in the region of £1.3 million, for a permanent transfer. The move was completed, for a fee reported by the BBC as £900,000, on 10 January; Clemence signed a three-and-a-half-year contract. He made his debut two days later in a 4–0 defeat to Arsenal at St Andrew's.

In July 2003, Birmingham City participated in the Premier League Asia Trophy in Kuala Lumpur; they failed to reach the final, but Clemence scored the third goal as they beat the Malaysian national team 4–0 to secure third place. Injury struck again in the 2003–04 season, meaning that once again he had to sit several games out. He also found himself competing with David Dunn and Robbie Savage for a central midfield spot. Nonetheless, he finished the season by making his 50th appearance for the club.

In the 2004–05 season, Clemence's first team chances were again in the balance when the club signed Muzzy Izzet, but he stated he would fight for his place in the team. The club opened talks with Clemence in May 2005, and he signed a new three-year contract on 14 October. Clemence suffered a calf problem in a 1–0 defeat to Aston Villa two days later, and on 4 April 2006, he tore a hamstring in a 1–0 win over Bolton Wanderers, sidelining him for the remainder of the season as Birmingham were relegated from the Premier League.

He contemplated leaving the club after being dropped twice in 2006–07, but later became an integral part of the team, helping the club win promotion back to the Premier League. For his contributions, Clemence won both the club's player of the year and players' player of the year awards that season. He played his last match for Birmingham in a 1–0 defeat to Preston North End on 6 May 2007, missing out on the Championship title.

In July 2007, Bruce confirmed that Clemence would be leaving the club because he could not guarantee him first-team football. He was linked with a £500,000 move to Charlton Athletic, Southampton were also believed to be monitoring him, while Leicester City were seeking a double signing with teammate DJ Campbell.

=== Leicester City ===
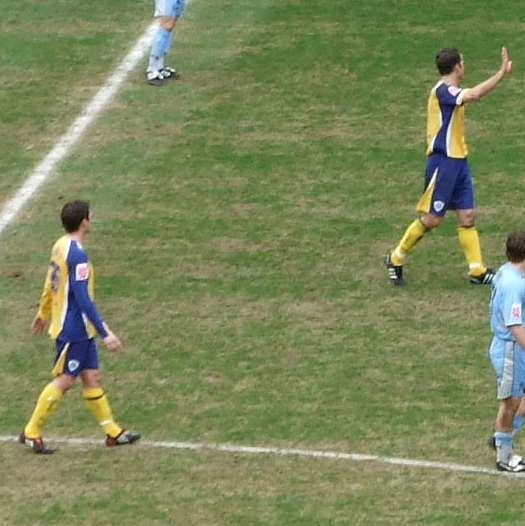
Clemence (right) and Matthew Oakley playing for Leicester City on 23 February 2008.

On 9 July, Leicester City made an offer for Clemence, which Birmingham rejected, demanding an increased bid for the player. On 13 July, Clemence signed a three-year contract with Leicester in a deal which "could rise to £1m". DJ Campbell joined him at the club seven days later. Clemence was named the new team captain on 28 July, and was picked by the BBC as Leicester's key player for the 2007–08 season. Clemence later admitted that "when [manager] Martin Allen was here, we didn't have a settled team and we were not sure if our jobs were safe."

He made his debut in a 1–0 defeat to Blackpool at the Walkers Stadium on 11 August 2007. Clemence scored his first goal with the stoppage-time winner for Leicester in a 3–2 League Cup win over Nottingham Forest on 18 September, and his second in a 1–1 draw with Charlton Athletic on 29 December. He suffered a calf strain in January 2008, followed by a thigh injury in early March, though he was sidelined for only a short while. On 29 March, Clemence tore a calf muscle in a 1–0 win over Scunthorpe United which kept him out for what remained of the season, as Leicester were relegated from the Championship. It proved to be the final competitive match of his career.

Clemence underwent an operation in April and was expected to recover in time for pre-season training. However, he suffered complications following surgery on his Achilles tendon. As a result, Clemence played no part in the 2008–09 season, while vice-captain Matthew Oakley took over the armband and helped the club regain promotion from League One. He had a second operation in October 2008, in which "the surgeon had to take the Achilles off the heel-bone, clear out the rubbish and then sew it back on. He also had to shave some of the bone off the heel." As of July 2009, Clemence was yet to recover from his heel injury, an ordeal he considered "tough to deal with mentally because this is the longest time I've had out of the game."

He marked his return to action in a 3–1 win over Derby County reserves on 8 September 2009, playing for 30 minutes as a substitute. He played his first full game in a 1–0 win over Barwell reserves on 13 October, and scored the match-winning penalty. Manager Nigel Pearson, however, said on 26 November that Clemence would not be rushed back into the first team, adding he wanted him to be "absolutely spot on" before returning. He returned to training intermittently with the squad in early December. On Easter Monday 2010 however, Clemence announced his retirement from football after failing to fully recover from his heel injury, and he was released by Leicester at the end of the season.

== Coaching career ==
Having coached youth sides during his playing career, Clemence joined Steve Bruce's staff at Sunderland as a development coach with the reserve team in the summer of 2010 having played for him at Birmingham City.

On 2 July 2012, it was announced that Clemence had been appointed head coach of the under-21s at Hull City, before later being promoted to first-team coach under Bruce. In October 2016, after contributing to two promotions to the Premier League and a run to the 2014 FA Cup final, Clemence left Hull City and reunited with Bruce again, this time as Aston Villa's first-team coach.

Clemence helped the Villains reach the Championship play-off final in 2018 having achieved a fourth-place domestic finish, in addition to helping develop talent such as Jack Grealish. Grealish spoke of Clemence's impact by saying: "I asked Stephen if he could help me and make me a better player. I am really close with him, he is the closest I have been out of all the assistant managers I have had. We go through all of my clips and discuss where I am going right or wrong. I am glad to have someone like Stephen taking the time out to help me and improve". On 3 October 2018, Bruce left the club, along with staff including Clemence.

On 2 January 2019, Sheffield Wednesday announced the appointment of Bruce as the club's head coach from 1 February, while Clemence and Steve Agnew would be in charge of the team until his arrival from which point Clemence functioned as first-team coach. Clemence resigned on 15 July to accept the position of assistant head coach of Premier League club Newcastle United under Bruce, where he would form a part of the coaching staff for 100 games before departing two years later.

Bruce was named manager of West Bromwich Albion in February 2022, and Clemence and Agnew became his assistants. When Bruce departed eight months later, his staff left with him.

After leaving West Bromwich Albion, Clemence declared he was looking for his first managerial role.

Clemence joined Blackpool as a first-team coach, under Steve Bruce and alongside Stephen Dobbie, in June 2025.

On 4 October 2025, he departed when Bruce was sacked.

== Managerial career ==
On 1 November 2023, Clemence was appointed head coach of League Two side Gillingham in his first managerial appointment. On 29 April 2024, following the final match of the season, he was sacked following a twelfth-place finish, six points off of the play-off places.

On 31 May 2024, Clemence was appointed head coach of fellow League Two side Barrow on a two-year deal. On 18 January 2025, Clemence departed the club, following a run of poor form.

== International career ==
Clemence was capped by the England national under-18 team, scoring two goals in seven appearances, between 1995 and 1996. He was capped once by the under-21 team, as a substitute in a 2–0 away win over Sweden on 4 September 1998. He was eligible to play for Northern Ireland through his Northern Ireland-born grandmother. Clemence rejected the chance to represent the country in both May and July 2004, a decision which manager Lawrie Sanchez said he would respect. Sanchez did ask Clemence to reconsider in October 2006, but he never represented a national team at senior level.

== Personal life ==
Clemence was born in Liverpool. He is the son of England international goalkeeper Ray Clemence, who was then a Liverpool player. In 2003, he married model and actress Angela Saunders. The couple had two children together. Clemence married former Brookside actress Suzanne Collins in June 2017.

Clemence is a brother-in-law of both former footballer Dougie Freedman and golfer Brian Davis, who are married to his sisters Sarah and Julie respectively.

On 21 November 2004, Clemence was a witness to racial abuse of his Birmingham City teammate Dwight Yorke during a match at Blackburn Rovers' Ewood Park, and gave information to the police. Five local men were convicted and banned from football grounds over the abuse.

== Career statistics ==
Appearances and goals by club, season and competition
Club	Season	League			National Cup		League Cup		Other		Total	
Club	Season	Division	Apps	Goals	Apps	Goals	Apps	Goals	Apps	Goals	Apps	Goals
Tottenham Hotspur	1997–98	Premier League	17	0	2	1	2	0	–		21	1
Tottenham Hotspur	1998–99	Premier League	17	0	1	0	3	0	–		21	0
Tottenham Hotspur	1999–2000	Premier League	20	1	1	0	0	0	3 (Note: Appearances in UEFA Cup)	0	24	1
Tottenham Hotspur	2000–01	Premier League	29	1	4	0	2	0	–		35	1
Tottenham Hotspur	2001–02	Premier League	6	0	0	0	0	0	–		6	0
Tottenham Hotspur	2002–03	Premier League	0	0	0	0	1	0	–		1	0
Tottenham Hotspur	Total		89	2	8	1	8	0	3	0	108	3
Birmingham City	2002–03	Premier League	15	2	–		–		–		15	2
Birmingham City	2003–04	Premier League	35	2	2	1	1	0	–		38	3
Birmingham City	2004–05	Premier League	22	0	2	0	2	0	–		26	0
Birmingham City	2005–06	Premier League	15	0	4	0	2	0	–		21	0
Birmingham City	2006–07	Championship	34	4	0	0	1	0	–		35	4
Birmingham City	Total		121	8	8	1	6	0	–		135	9
Leicester City	2007–08	Championship	31	2	0	0	3	1	–		34	3
Leicester City	2008–09	League One	0	0	0	0	0	0	0	0	0	0
Leicester City	2009–10	Championship	0	0	0	0	0	0	0	0	0	0
Leicester City	Total		31	2	0	0	3	1	0	0	34	3
Career total			241	12	16	2	17	1	3	0	277	15

== Managerial statistics ==
As of 18 January 2025

Team	From	To	Record					Ref
Team	From	To	G	W	D	L	Win %	Ref
Gillingham	1 November 2023	29 April 2024	34	12	9	13	35.29	
Barrow	31 May 2024	18 January 2025	32	9	8	15	28.13	
Total			66	21	17	28	31.82	

== Honours ==
Birmingham City

- Football League Championship runner-up: 2006–07

Individual

- Birmingham City Player of the Year: 2006–07
- Birmingham City Players' Player of the Year: 2006–07
