= Thomas Gainsborough School =

Location
- Head Lane; Great Cornard, Sudbury, Suffolk, CO10 0NH; England
- Coordinates: 52°01′28″N 0°44′59″E

Information
- Type: Academy
- Motto: Excellence: For Each, For All
- Established: September 1973
- Local authority: Suffolk
- Department for Education URN: 141639 Tables
- Ofsted: Reports
- Chair of Governors: Sue Leon
- Headteacher: Helen Yapp
- Deputy Head Teachers: Chris Ryall, Christian Appleford
- Gender: Coeducational
- Age: 11 to 18
- Enrolment: 1,400
- Houses: Abbas, Chamberlain, Houghton, Peyton, Tollemache
- Website: http://www.tgschool.net

Thomas Gainsborough School, formerly Great Cornard Upper School, is a secondary school and sixth form in the village of Great Cornard, part of the town of Sudbury in the English county of Suffolk that educates approximately 1,400 pupils.

It was granted the status of Specialist School in 1998, and was re-designated Technology College in 2001. The school converted to academy status in January 2015, when it became a member of the Samuel Ward Academy Trust.

== Facilities ==
Included in the school is Great Cornard Sports Centre, and included coffee shop, funded in part by a £563k grant from the English Active lottery fund. The complex features a youth drop-in-centre, dance and martial arts studios, changing rooms, fitness studios, a coach education unit and a social area. The school also completed the building of a Sixth Form study block and library in 2009, this building has since been renamed 'The Bavington Centre', and the Sixth Form area relocated.

=== Reconstruction ===
In 2012, the school was granted funding for a total rebuild. Work commenced on the new building in June 2014 and was completed in August 2015. The new facilities of the £17 million site include a reading room, roof terrace and 9,124 sqm of space. Whilst the main complex of the old school site were demolished, the library and sports centre were not and are still utilized by the school. Additionally, the old site of Great Cornard Middle School that was acquired by Thomas Gainsborough School after the switch to a two-tier system remained, with the building now being used as a Sixth Form and Media centre.

== Academic performance ==
In their report on the school in September 2017 Ofsted gave an overall rating of the school as Good, point two on a four-point scale. The personal development, behaviour and welfare of pupils was described as outstanding.

Results for pupils at age 16 showed clear improvement between 2006 and 2009 outperforming both local and national indicators for pupils gaining 5 GCSE grades between A* and C, including English and Maths. In 2009 the school had the best contextual value added scores of any school in Suffolk.

== Headteachers ==
The current headteacher at The Thomas Gainsborough school is Mrs Helen Yapp, who became head in March 2021, after a brief period of filling the role as Acting Headteacher, after Mr Wayne Lloyd's departure from the school in December 2020.

Mr Wayne Lloyd was the headteacher between January 2012 and December 2020. The previous headteacher Mr Michael Foley moved to become headteacher of the Thomas Hardye School in September 2011. Andy Samways (Deputy Headteacher) was Acting Headteacher between these dates.

== Incidents ==
- Former head of religious studies and head of year Steve Morris, who had moved to Aldershot, was sentenced to 15 months in prison in May 2007 having admitted three counts of indecently assaulting a pupil at Great Cornard Upper School.
- On 10 June 2004, three girls needed medical attention for the effects of gas after raiders struck at the hotel where they were staying during a school trip in Villepinte, France.
- Across the 25, 26 and 27 January 2019, the school was victim to a series of acts of vandalism outside of school hours, resulting in an estimated £10,000 worth of damage. Similar incidents also occurred at the neighboring school of Ormiston Sudbury Academy.
- On the 27th September 2024, the school along with the neighbouring Wells Hall Primary School was placed into lockdown after police were called to the perimeter of the school for an incident involving 3 males potentially carrying a knife.

== Notable former pupils ==
- Television actor Rocky Marshall studied at the school in the late 1980s.
- Ipswich Town footballer Jamie Griffiths studied at the school from 2006 to 2008 and currently plays for Kettering Town, after a loan spell at Plymouth Argyle, and a short time at Sudbury.
- England Goalkeeper Ian Walker studied at the school in the late 1980s.
- Olympic Competitor (London 2012 seated discus) Jonathan Adams (athlete), studied at the school during his youth
