= Angela Saunders =

English model and actress

- Born: May 1977 (age 49); Bromley, London, England
- Occupations: Model; actress

Angela Saunders (born May 1977) is an English model and actress.

== Early life ==
Saunders trained as a youth in tap dance and ballet. She then became a hospital worker who did part-time modelling work, and after appearing as a nurse in the Scottish soap opera McCallum, aged 21 she became a dancer on a cruise ship.

On her return to the UK, she became a full-time model and then grid-girl for three years in Formula One. She also had a job on Ant and Dec's children's show, SMTV Live.

== Acting career ==
In 2002, Saunders got the part of Tash Parker on Sky One's Dream Team football soap opera. While undertaking the part, ITV1 asked her to audition for the similar Footballers Wives – first for the role of Chardonnay, and then a blonde named Cheryl. ITV scrapped the idea because the character was allegedly too much like Sheryl Gascoigne.

== Personal life ==
Although previously she did not take much interest in football, in 2003 Saunders married then Birmingham City footballer Stephen Clemence. The couple have two children, Jack and Sadie, Jack born on 5 February 2005 and Sadie on 20 April 2007. The couple have since divorced. Angela is now remarried to Dean Harrison.
