= Rossett School =

Academy in Harrogate, North Yorkshire, England

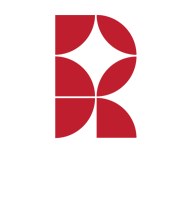

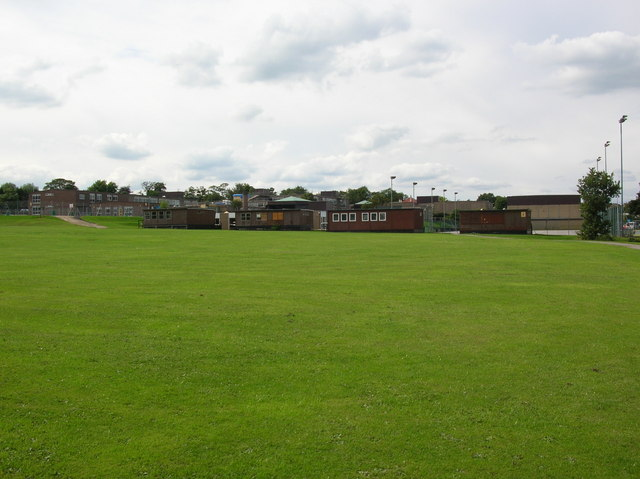

Location
- Green Lane; Harrogate, North Yorkshire, HG2 9JP; England; 53°58′34″N 1°33′09″W

Information
- Type: Academy
- Motto: Success for everyone
- Established: 1973; 53 years ago
- Local authority: North Yorkshire
- Specialist: Maths and computing (operational)
- Department for Education URN: 136896 Tables
- Ofsted: Reports
- Head teacher: Tim Milburn
- Gender: Co-educational
- Age: 11 to 18
- Enrolment: 1,412
- Website: www.rossettschool.co.uk

Rossett School is a co-educational secondary school with academy status in Harrogate, North Yorkshire, England. Its pupils are from Harrogate, neighbouring towns and villages, and nearby Leeds, with the latter being a large part of the enrolment. Current enrolment is around 1,400 including 214 in the sixth form.

== History ==
The school was founded in 1973 as Rossett High School and is Harrogate's most recently built secondary school with additions to its original building since its construction.

A report in 2007 by the Office for Standards in Education (Ofsted) rated the school as Grade 3 (satisfactory) for overall effectiveness.

In June 2010 a report by the Office for Standards in Education (Ofsted) rated the school as Grade 1 (outstanding) for overall effectiveness

In December 2010 the actor and gay rights champion Sir Ian McKellen visited Rossett School as part of his national campaign to tackle homophobic discrimination and bullying in Britain's schools.

In 2012 the school began a scheme that allows pupils to bring iPads to school, either through purchase, renting, or borrowing from the school.

In June 2019 a report by the Office for Standards in Education (Ofsted) rated the school as Grade 3 (requires improvement) for overall effectiveness

== Notable alumni ==
- Rachel Daly – Professional football player who plays for the Houston Dash in the NWSL and the England national team
- John Scales - ex-professional footballer for Wimbledon, Liverpool and Tottenham Hotspur
- Liam Kitching Professional footballer for Coventry City FC.
