= Ruel Fox =

English footballer (born 1968)

Personal information
- Full name: Ruel Adrian Fox
- Date of birth: 14 January 1968 (age 58)
- Place of birth: Ipswich, England
- Height: 5 ft 6 in (1.68 m)
- Position: Midfielder

Team information
- Current team: Whitton United (chairman)

Senior career*
Years	Team	Apps	(Gls)
1986–1994	Norwich City	173	(22)
1994–1995	Newcastle United	58	(12)
1995–2000	Tottenham Hotspur	106	(13)
2000–2002	West Bromwich Albion	56	(2)
Total		395	(49)

International career
1994	England B	2	(0)
2004	Montserrat	2	(1)

Managerial career
- 2004–2009: Whitton United
- 2004: Montserrat
- * Club domestic league appearances and goals

Ruel Adrian Fox (born 14 January 1968) is a former professional footballer and the club chairman of Whitton United.

As a player he was a midfielder who played in the Premier League for Norwich City, Newcastle United and Tottenham Hotspur. He also played in the Football League for West Bromwich Albion. He was capped twice at England B level, but later, despite it being two years since retiring, he awarded himself two caps for Montserrat whilst serving as head coach.

Following retirement, Fox had a spell as manager of non-league Whitton United, where he has also acted as assistant manager and currently remains as the chairman. He has also worked as a personal trainer and has worked for Suffolk College.

== Club career ==
=== Norwich City ===
Fox made his senior debut for Norwich City during the 1986–87 season in a Full Members Cup match against Coventry City and made his league debut against Oxford United at Carrow Road a few days later.

After several seasons of being a substitute and finding it difficult to hold down a regular first team spot, he eventually established himself and played an important part in the 1992–93 and 1993–94 campaigns, which were two of the best in the club's history. In 1992–93, they led the inaugural FA Premier League several times before finished a club best third, and in 1993–94 they reached the last 16 of the UEFA Cup, defeating Bayern Munich on the way. He had also been involved in Norwich's runs to the semi-finals of the FA Cup final in 1989 and 1992, and their previous highs of finishing fifth in the old First Division in 1987 and fourth in 1989.

He was a fast, tricky winger who outran defenders and provided good crosses. In 2002, Norwich supporters voted Fox an inaugural member of the Norwich City F.C. Hall of Fame.

=== Newcastle United ===
Fox left Norwich on 2 February 1994 to join Newcastle United for a fee of £2,250,000. Upon signing him, Newcastle manager Kevin Keegan described him as "the best player in his position in the country".

Fox was an early member of the Newcastle teams known as "the Entertainers". He played in Newcastle's final 14 games of the 1993–94 season and scored twice as they finished third in the Premier League and qualified for the UEFA Cup – the first time since the 1970s that the Magpies had competed in Europe. He scored 10 league goals in the 1994–95 season, as the Magpies finished sixth and just missed out on another European campaign having led the league for the first quarter of the season, but the arrival of David Ginola in June 1995 left Fox facing a fight for regular first team action. He did, however, play five times for the Magpies the following season.

=== Tottenham Hotspur ===
Fox signed for Tottenham Hotspur on 6 October 1995 in a deal worth £4.25 million. His fee made him Tottenham's second most costly player at the time, behind Chris Armstrong whose £4.5 million deal had been concluded just a few months earlier. Despite not being part of Tottenham's squad for the 1999 Football League Cup Final he made three appearances during their victorious League Cup campaign.

=== West Bromwich Albion ===
Fox found it difficult to settle at White Hart Lane and he was constantly linked with moves away from Tottenham Hotspur before joining West Bromwich Albion at the start of the 2000–01 season. He helped them to promotion in 2001–02, before being released at the end of the season. He subsequently retired from playing professionally.

== Coaching career ==
Fox was named head coach of Montserrat in October 2004, and despite being two years since he retired from playing, he gave himself two international caps and scored once for his adopted nation in a 5–4 defeat against Antigua on 2 November 2004.

Upon his return he was named as coach of non-League football club Whitton United and remained in that role until 2008, where he was replaced by his assistant Ronnie Mauge. He has also acted as assistant manager and now is the club's chairman. He also became a coach at Suffolk College.

== Personal life ==
In November 2008, Fox returned to hometown Ipswich and ran his own restaurant and bar.

In 2012, Fox was working as a personal trainer in Ipswich.
