= Ian Walker (footballer) =

English footballer and manager (born 1971)

Personal information
- Full name: Ian Michael Walker
- Date of birth: 31 October 1971 (age 55)
- Place of birth: Watford, England
- Height: 6 ft 2 in (1.88 m)
- Position: Goalkeeper

Team information
- Current team: Shanghai SIPG (goalkeeping coach)

Youth career
- –1989: Tottenham Hotspur

Senior career*
Years	Team	Apps	(Gls)
1989–2001	Tottenham Hotspur	259	(0)
1990	→ Oxford United (loan)	2	(0)
1990	→ Ipswich Town (loan)	0	(0)
2001–2005	Leicester City	140	(0)
2005–2008	Bolton Wanderers	0	(0)
Total		401	(0)

International career
1990–1993	England U21	9	(0)
1996–2004	England	4	(0)
1998	England B	1	(0)

Managerial career
- 2011–2012: Bishop's Stortford
- * Club domestic league appearances and goals

Ian Michael Walker (born 31 October 1971) is an English professional football coach and former player who is the goalkeeping coach of Chinese Super League side Shanghai SIPG.

As a player, he was a goalkeeper who notably played in the Premier League for Tottenham Hotspur and Leicester City. He made 259 league appearances for Spurs and was their first choice keeper from 1994 until just before his departure in 2001. He also finished his career with a three-year spell in the top flight with Bolton Wanderers but all eight of his appearances came in cup competitions. He also had brief loan spells in the Football League with Oxford United and Ipswich Town. Walker was capped four times by England, he was part of the Euro 96 squad and would go on to be selected for Euro 2004. He was also capped at U21 and B team level.

Following retirement, he later became manager of non-league side Bishop's Stortford, before moving to China as the goalkeeping coach for Shanghai Shenhua in 2012. Two-years later he moved to rivals Shanghai SIPG in a similar role.

== Club career ==
=== Tottenham Hotspur ===
After starting out with the team in the late 1980s as a trainee and having two loan spells away, at Ipswich Town and Oxford United Walker played in the winning 1989–90 FA Youth Cup Tottenham team overcoming Middlesbrough. During the early 1990s Walker was mainly used as the reserve keeper, making the odd cup appearance along the way, but after a serious injury to then Spurs keeper Erik Thorstvedt Walker took his chance and soon became the number 1 at Spurs, cementing his place in the side and getting his chance in the team during the first season of the Premiership making a total of 17 appearances in the league. 1992–93 season. Walker went on and made a total of 312 appearances for Tottenham Hotspur and played a big part during the 1999 season in helping Spurs win the 1999 Football League Cup Final after beating Leicester City 1–0 at Wembley Stadium. During the latter stages of Walkers career at Spurs he fell out of favour with the management and lost his place to the newly signed Neil Sullivan it was shortly after this, that the England international handed in a transfer request in September 2000. He played his final game for Spurs against West Ham United on 31 January 2001.

=== Leicester City ===
Walker signed a four-year contract with Leicester City in July 2001 for a fee of £2.5 million, rising to £3 million depending on appearances. His first season at the club ended in relegation to the First Division, which he felt may have ruined his dreams of an England call-up for the 2002 World Cup. Walker had an impressive season with Leicester as they regained promotion to the Premier League, earning his first England recall in six years in May 2003.

A cult hero to many of the Foxes fans, Walker had an indifferent season back in the Premier League, producing moments of magic, but unfortunately it all unraveled in a match against Aston Villa at the Walkers Stadium on 31 January 2004, in which he conceded five goals in 18 minutes. Walker put up such a poor display in the match that he was confronted by a Leicester fan who ran onto the pitch, telling him he "didn't think he was fit to be a Premiership player." On 10 February 2004, Walker scored a bizarre own goal in a match against Bolton Wanderers to give them a 1–1 draw at Leicester. Despite comfortably saving Kevin Davies' shot, he lost grasp of the ball as it crawled over the goal line. He did make a comeback performance in a goalless home draw against Wolves on 28 February, putting up a "world-class save" to deny Kenny Miller. Walker pledged to stay at Leicester despite their relegation from the Premier League in the 2003–04 season. He was released from Leicester City on 6 May 2005, after the club could not afford him a new contract. Walker spent four years at Leicester.

=== Bolton Wanderers ===
Walker joined Bolton on a one-year contract. Walker was the goalkeeper for Bolton's first ever European match away from England against Bulgarian team Lokomotiv Plovdiv, which was also his debut.

== International career ==
Walker was capped by the England national team four times, making his debut in 1996 against Hungary. His most infamous game was against Italy in a qualification match for the 1998 World Cup where he is widely believed to have been at fault to a Gianfranco Zola strike. England lost this game to Italy 1–0 at Wembley Stadium. He backed up David James at Euro 2004 but was overtaken by others in the pecking order. Despite Walker's club Leicester suffering relegation from the Premier League, he played his first England match in seven years as a 61st-minute substitute for Paul Robinson in a 6–1 win over Iceland on 5 June 2004, which was also his last international.

== Coaching career ==
On 14 March 2011, Walker was appointed as manager of Bishop's Stortford who were playing in the Conference South.

In April 2012, Walker joined his former Bolton teammate Nicolas Anelka at Chinese Super League side Shanghai Shenhua and became their goalkeeping coach. On 2 January 2014, Walker became the goalkeeping coach of Shanghai East Asia, another Super League team in Shanghai. On 15 May 2014, Walker signed a new contract with Shanghai East Asia, keeping him at the club until the end of 2017 season.

Walker continues to coach the first team goalkeepers at Shanghai SIPG. Walker has produced two national team goalkeepers for China, Wang Dalei from Shanghai Shenhua in 2012–13 and Yan Junling from Shanghai SIPG in 2014–15.

In the 2018 season Walker was the goalkeeper coach when Shanghai SIPG won their first ever league title.

== Personal life ==
Walker is the son of Mike Walker who was also a goalkeeper and managed Norwich City and Everton and his wife Jacqueline.

Walker attended Great Cornard Upper School. He and his former Page Three wife Suzi lived in a mock-Tudor mansion in Cobham, Surrey, as featured on MTV Cribs. After the birth of her daughter Sophie in 1998, Suzi suffered post natal eclampsia, and is an ongoing sufferer of myalgic encephalomyelitis. He became a father just months after the death of his mother Jackie in 1997 after a long battle against cancer.

== Career statistics ==
=== Club ===
Appearances and goals by club, season and competition
Club	Season	League			FA Cup		League Cup		Other		Total	
Club	Season	Division	Apps	Goals	Apps	Goals	Apps	Goals	Apps	Goals	Apps	Goals
Tottenham Hotspur	1989–90	First Division	0	0	0	0	0	0	—		0	0
Tottenham Hotspur	1990–91	First Division	1	0	0	0	—		—		1	0
Tottenham Hotspur	1991–92	First Division	18	0	0	0	1	0	2 (Note: Appearances in European Cup Winners' Cup)	0	21	0
Tottenham Hotspur	1992–93	Premier League	17	0	0	0	2	0	—		19	0
Tottenham Hotspur	1993–94	Premier League	11	0	2	0	1	0	—		14	0
Tottenham Hotspur	1994–95	Premier League	41	0	6	0	2	0	—		49	0
Tottenham Hotspur	1995–96	Premier League	38	0	6	0	3	0	0	0	47	0
Tottenham Hotspur	1996–97	Premier League	37	0	1	0	4	0	—		42	0
Tottenham Hotspur	1997–98	Premier League	29	0	1	0	3	0	—		33	0
Tottenham Hotspur	1998–99	Premier League	25	0	7	0	4	0	—		36	0
Tottenham Hotspur	1999–2000	Premier League	38	0	2	0	2	0	4 (Note: Appearances in UEFA Cup)	0	46	0
Tottenham Hotspur	2000–01	Premier League	4	0	0	0	1	0	—		5	0
Tottenham Hotspur	Total		259	0	25	0	23	0	6	0	313	0
Oxford United (loan)	1990–91	Second Division	2	0	—		1	0	—		3	0
Ipswich Town (loan)	1990–91	Second Division	0	0	—		—		—		0	0
Leicester City	2001–02	Premier League	35	0	2	0	2	0	—		39	0
Leicester City	2002–03	First Division	46	0	2	0	3	0	—		51	0
Leicester City	2003–04	Premier League	37	0	2	0	1	0	—		40	0
Leicester City	2004–05	Championship	22	0	4	0	0	0	—		26	0
Leicester City	Total		140	0	10	0	6	0	—		156	0
Bolton Wanderers	2005–06	Premier League	0	0	1	0	1	0	3	0	5	0
Bolton Wanderers	2006–07	Premier League	0	0	1	0	2	0	—		3	0
Bolton Wanderers	Total		0	0	2	0	3	0	3	0	8	0
Career total			401	0	37	0	33	0	9	0	480	0

=== International ===
Appearances and goals by national team and year
National team	Year	Apps	Goals
England	1995	0	0
England	1996	2	0
England	1997	1	0
England	1998	0	0
England	1999	0	0
England	2000	0	0
England	2001	0	0
England	2002	0	0
England	2003	0	0
England	2004	1	0
Total		4	0

== Honours ==
Tottenham Hotspur

- FA Cup: 1990-91
- Football League Cup: 1998–99
