= Stephen Carr =

Irish former footballer (born 1976)

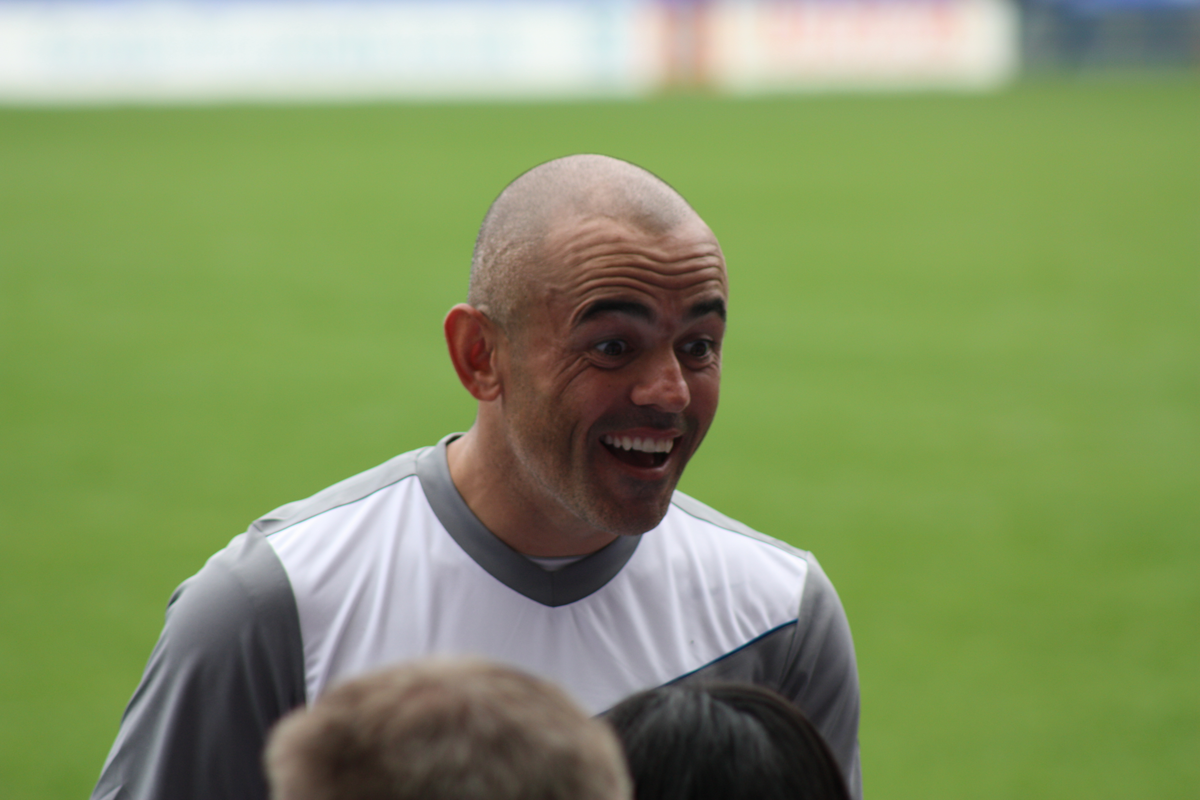
- Carr in pre-season for Birmingham in 2011

Personal information
- Full name: Stephen Carr
- Date of birth: 29 August 1976 (age 50)
- Place of birth: Dublin, Ireland
- Height: 1.75 m (5 ft 9 in)
- Position: Right back

Youth career
- 198x–1991: Stella Maris
- 1991–1993: Tottenham Hotspur

Senior career*
Years	Team	Apps	(Gls)
1993–2004	Tottenham Hotspur	226	(7)
2004–2008	Newcastle United	78	(1)
2009–2013	Birmingham City	106	(0)
Total		410	(8)

International career
1993–1994	Republic of Ireland U18	6	(0)
1994–1997	Republic of Ireland U21	12	(1)
1999–2007	Republic of Ireland	44	(0)
- * Club domestic league appearances and goals

Stephen Carr (born 29 August 1976) is an Irish former professional footballer who played as a right-back, sometimes deputising at left-back or centre back. He started his career with Premier League team Tottenham Hotspur in 1993 and remained with the club until 2004. He had a spell with Newcastle United until 2008. From 2009 until 2013 he stayed with Birmingham City, also captaining the side. He is a former international player with the Republic of Ireland, having made 44 appearances.

== Club career ==
=== Tottenham Hotspur ===
Carr was born in Dublin. As a fifteen-year-old, he went on trial from Stella Maris to Tottenham Hotspur and was signed up by then manager Ossie Ardiles. He made his debut for the club on 26 September 1993 away to Ipswich Town in the 1993–94 FA Premier League season. However he had to wait until the 1996–97 season to establish himself as a regular first-team player, when he made 28 appearances that campaign.

He picked up a League Cup medal with Spurs in 1999 after contributing to a 1–0 win over Leicester City in the final. The 1999–2000 season was arguably his best ever as far as his performances are concerned, as well as scoring a "thunderous piledriver" against champions Manchester United.

His reputation continued to grow throughout the 2000–01 season, and other clubs were beginning to show interest in signing him. However, in the summer of 2001, he began to have problems with his knee and required an operation which he underwent in September of that year. He did not make any appearances in the 2001–02 season and also missed the 2002 FIFA World Cup finals. It was not until October 2002 that Carr was back fully fit. As he returned to form, interest from other Premiership clubs started to resurface. Carr was linked with Manchester United, and a move to Newcastle United was on the cards.

=== Newcastle United ===
Carr signed for Newcastle United in August 2004 when then manager Bobby Robson signed him for a fee of £2 million on a four-year contract. Soon after he signed Robson was sacked from his managerial post by chairman Freddy Shepherd. He was replaced by Graeme Souness, who, like Robson, saw Carr as a first-team player. Carr's debut for the club came in a 2–2 draw against Middlesbrough on 14 August. He played in 26 league games in the 2004–05 season, scoring once. His first goal for the club came from a "fierce shot from well outside the area" against Southampton. He helped Newcastle reach the quarter-finals of the UEFA Cup and the semi-final of the FA Cup. Newcastle finished 14th, which put pressure on Souness.

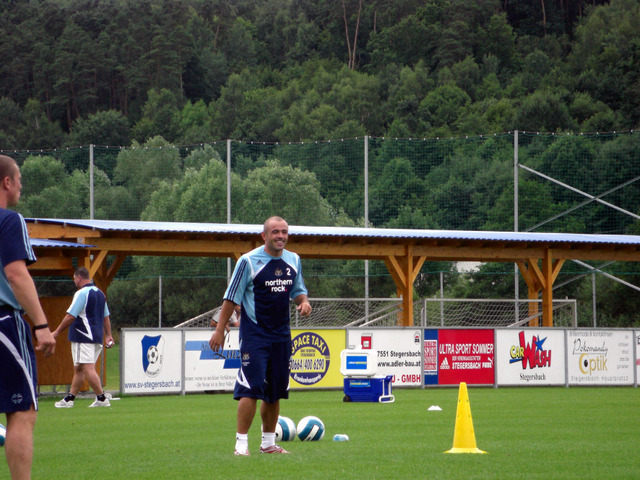
In 2007 pre-season training with Newcastle

In the 2005–06 season, he only managed to make 19 league appearances for the club as the persistent knee injury ruled him out for two months. The team finished 7th in the league under the new management of Glenn Roeder, after Souness was sacked in January.

Carr was one of the many injury victims during Newcastle's 2006–07 season and was out with a fractured foot for a few months. He returned for the 2–2 draw against West Ham United on 20 January 2007, filling in at an unfamiliar left-back position after impressive displays from Nolberto Solano at right-back during Carr's absence, putting question marks over his future at the club. He fell further down the pecking order during the 2007–08 season with the signings of Habib Beye and Geremi. Beye's impressive form and Carr's inability to maintain fitness resulted in Kevin Keegan deciding against renewing Carr's contract and he was released at the end of the season.

=== After Newcastle ===
Carr was linked with moves to Everton, West Ham United, Wigan Athletic, Hertha Berlin, Racing Genk and Bohemians. He was also on trial with League One side Leicester City where he would have linked up with Nigel Pearson whom he played under at Newcastle. Having failed to find a suitable club, Carr announced his retirement from all forms of football on 1 December 2008.

=== Birmingham City ===
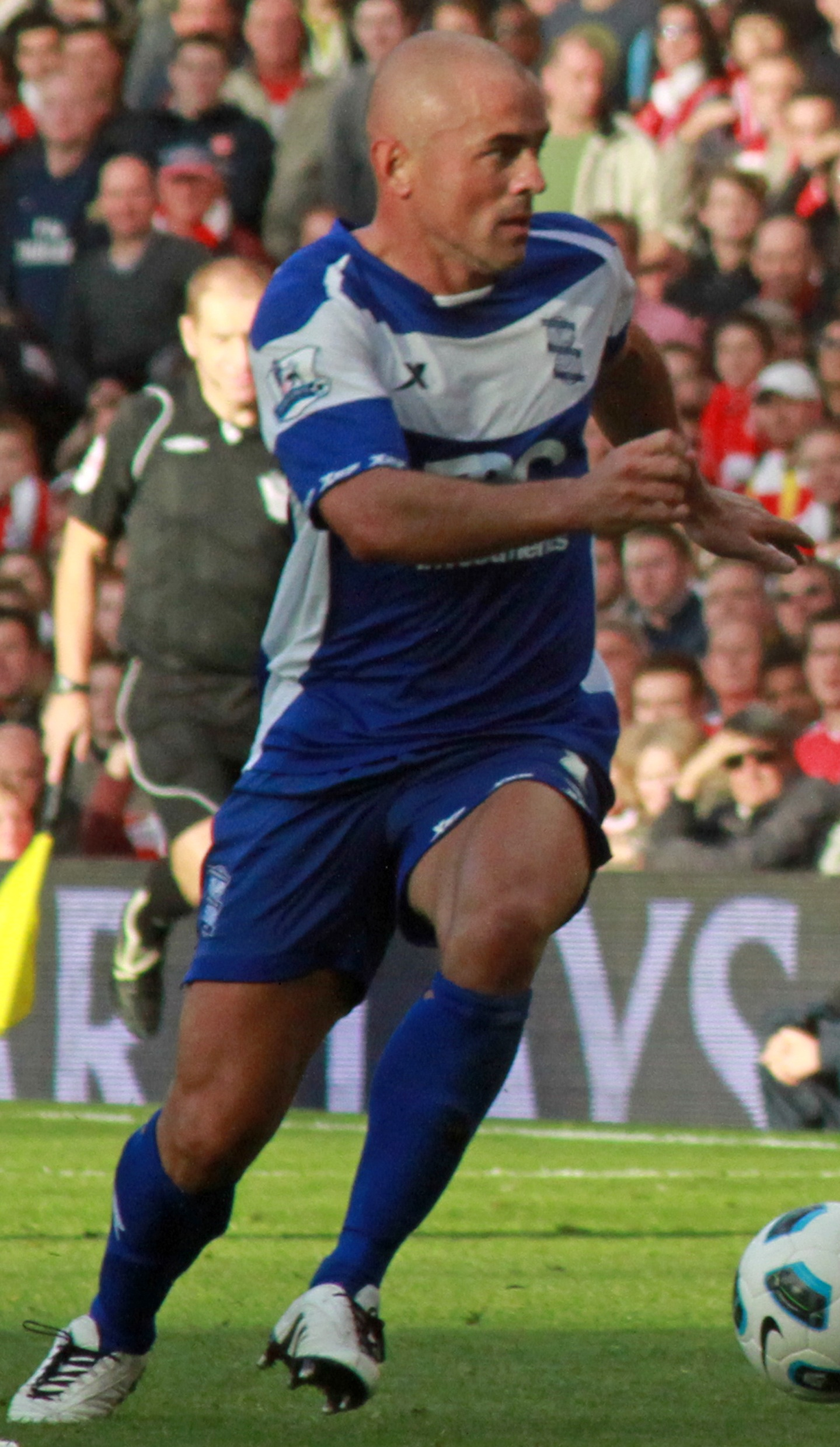
Carr with Birmingham City

In February 2009 he began training with Birmingham City with a view to coming out of retirement, and signed a one-month contract with the club on 23 February. He made his debut the following day, playing the whole of the goalless draw away to Crystal Palace. After impressing during the initial month, Carr signed an extension until the end of the season. Following Birmingham's promotion to the Premier League, Carr signed a new two-year contract with the club. Made acting captain in the absence through injury and squad rotation of Lee Carsley, he was a member of the Birmingham team that went 15 games unbeaten in all competitions, including a club record 12 unbeaten in the top flight, during the 2009–10 Premier League season. Towards the end of the season Carr received a one-match suspension for improper conduct after making an "offensive gesture" towards Aston Villa supporters at the end of the local derby lost by Birmingham via a late, controversial penalty.

He captained the team to victory in the 2011 Football League Cup final as Birmingham defeated favourites Arsenal 2–1. Carr played every game of the 2010–11 Premier League season, at the end of which Birmingham were relegated to the Championship, and the club took up the option of retaining his services for another year.

Carr made his 100th appearance for Birmingham in the Europa League play-off round first leg against Portuguese club Nacional, the first time the club had participated in major European competition for nearly 50 years. He missed much of the second half of the 2011–12 season with knee cartilage damage, and his contract expired in June, but after the appointment of former Newcastle teammate Lee Clark as Birmingham's manager, he signed a one-year deal with the club. Investigation of an injury sustained in a pre-season friendly in August revealed knee damage requiring surgery predicted to keep him out for six months.

Carr was unable to play again, and at the end of the 2012–13 season he announced his retirement from football. Although Clark had hoped to persuade him to stay at Birmingham as a coach, Carr confirmed that he and his family intended to move to Spain where he had business interests.

== International career ==
Carr represented his country at schoolboy, youth, under-18, under-21 and full international levels. He missed out on the 2002 World Cup due to injury.

Carr initially retired from the international scene after the team failed to qualify for the 2006 FIFA World Cup, having played 39 times for his country. However he was convinced to continue playing international football by new Ireland manager Steve Staunton. Due to injuries and the sacking of Irish manager Staunton, Carr retired from international football on 14 November 2007.

== Career statistics ==
=== Club ===
Appearances and goals by club, season and competition
Club	Season	League			FA Cup		League Cup		Europe		Total	
Club	Season	Division	Apps	Goals	Apps	Goals	Apps	Goals	Apps	Goals	Apps	Goals
Tottenham Hotspur	1993–94	Premier League	1	0	0	0	1	0	–		2	0
Tottenham Hotspur	1994–95	Premier League	0	0	0	0	0	0	–		0	0
Tottenham Hotspur	1995–96	Premier League	0	0	0	0	0	0	2 (Note: Appearances in UEFA Intertoto Cup)	0	2	0
Tottenham Hotspur	1996–97	Premier League	26	0	1	0	3	0	–		30	0
Tottenham Hotspur	1997–98	Premier League	38	0	3	0	2	0	–		43	0
Tottenham Hotspur	1998–99	Premier League	37	0	7	0	8	1	–		52	1
Tottenham Hotspur	1999–2000	Premier League	34	3	0	0	1	0	4 (Note: Appearances in UEFA Cup)	0	39	3
Tottenham Hotspur	2000–01	Premier League	28	3	2	0	3	0	–		33	3
Tottenham Hotspur	2001–02	Premier League	0	0	0	0	0	0	–		0	0
Tottenham Hotspur	2002–03	Premier League	30	0	1	0	1	0	–		32	0
Tottenham Hotspur	2003–04	Premier League	32	1	3	0	4	0	–		39	1
Tottenham Hotspur	Total		226	7	17	0	23	1	6	0	272	8
Newcastle United	2004–05	Premier League	26	1	4	0	0	0	9	0	39	1
Newcastle United	2005–06	Premier League	19	0	2	0	0	0	3	0	24	0
Newcastle United	2006–07	Premier League	23	0	0	0	1	0	8 (Note: Two appearances in UEFA Intertoto Cup, six in UEFA Cup)	0	32	0
Newcastle United	2007–08	Premier League	10	0	2	0	0	0	–		12	0
Newcastle United	Total		78	1	8	0	1	0	20	0	107	1
Birmingham City	2008–09	Championship	13	0	0	0	0	0	–		13	0
Birmingham City	2009–10	Premier League	35	0	4	0	1	0	–		40	0
Birmingham City	2010–11	Premier League	38	0	1	0	5	0	–		44	0
Birmingham City	2011–12	Championship	20	0	1	0	0	0	3 (Note: Appearances in UEFA Europa League)	0	24	0
Birmingham City	2012–13	Championship	0	0	0	0	0	0	–		0	0
Birmingham City	Total		106	0	6	0	6	0	3	0	121	0
Career total			410	8	31	0	30	1	29	0	500	9

=== International ===
Appearances and goals by national team and year
National team	Year	Apps	Goals
Ireland	1999	8	0
Ireland	2000	7	0
Ireland	2001	3	0
Ireland	2002	0	0
Ireland	2003	11	0
Ireland	2004	6	0
Ireland	2005	6	0
Ireland	2006	2	0
Ireland	2007	1	0
Total		44	0

== Honours ==
Tottenham Hotspur

- Football League Cup: 1998–99

Newcastle United

- UEFA Intertoto Cup: 2006

Birmingham City

- Football League Championship runner-up: 2008–09
- Football League Cup: 2010–11

Individual

- PFA Team of the Year: 2000–01 Premier League, 2002–03 Premier League
- Tottenham Hotspur Members Club Player of the Year: 1999, 2000
