= Chris Armstrong (footballer, born 1971) =

English footballer (born 1971)

Personal information
- Full name: Christopher Peter Armstrong
- Date of birth: 19 June 1971 (age 55)
- Place of birth: Newcastle upon Tyne, England
- Height: 6 ft 0 in (1.83 m)
- Position: Striker

Senior career*
Years	Team	Apps	(Gls)
–1989	Llay Welfare		
1989–1991	Wrexham	60	(13)
1991–1992	Millwall	28	(5)
1992–1995	Crystal Palace	118	(45)
1995–2002	Tottenham Hotspur	141	(48)
2002–2003	Bolton Wanderers	0	(0)
2003–2005	Wrexham	59	(13)
Total		406	(124)

International career
1994	England B	1	(0)
- * Club domestic league appearances and goals

Christopher Peter Armstrong (born 19 June 1971) is an English former footballer who played professionally as a striker from 1989 to 2005.

He grew up in North Wales, where he played in the amateur game for Llay Welfare before making his professional debut for Wrexham in 1989. After one season at Millwall, he made a £1 million transfer to Crystal Palace of the Premier League in 1992. In March 1995, he became the first Premier League player to receive a doping ban, testing positive for cannabis. He joined Tottenham Hotspur that June for a club record £4.5 million and was part of their team that won the League Cup in 1999. After a one-game spell at Bolton Wanderers, he returned to Wrexham for the remainder of his career.

Armstrong was tracked by the international teams of Wales, Nigeria and the Republic of Ireland but rejected all three. He earned one cap for England B in 1994 and was called up to the senior side in March 1999 but did not play.

== Club career ==
=== Early career ===
Armstrong was born in Newcastle upon Tyne to an Irish father and Nigerian mother, and moved to London at age three. He was raised by foster parents in Wales, where he began playing as an amateur goalkeeper in local leagues, before leaving school and giving up on football aged 16. A friend reintroduced him to the game by bringing him to Llay Welfare in the Welsh National League, while he packed burgers during the day for £30 a week. He gained the attention of local professional club Wrexham.

At Wrexham, Armstrong made his professional debut as a teenager during the 1989–90 Football League season in the old Fourth Division, and managed to score three times through the course of the season. In his two-year spell at the club, he went on to play 60 games, scoring 13 times. He took part in the 1990–91 European Cup Winners' Cup, where he scored the only goal of the first round tie against Denmark's Lyngby before elimination by eventual champions Manchester United in the second round.

He moved to Bruce Rioch's Millwall for £50,000 in August 1991.

=== Crystal Palace ===
After one season with Millwall, Armstrong joined Steve Coppell's Crystal Palace for £1 million in 1992, ahead of the inaugural season of the Premier League. He found a home at Selhurst Park, where he was the club's top-scorer with 15 league goals in his first campaign.

In January 1995, Kevin Keegan's Newcastle United bid £4.7 million to sign Armstrong, but Palace rejected the offer.

In March 1995, Armstrong tested positive for cannabis, becoming the first Premier League player to fail a drug test, and was banned for four matches. The Independent sports writer Glenn Moore criticised The FA for punishing Armstrong despite not taking action against Dennis Wise and Vinnie Jones for recent violent offences, adding that cannabis was extremely unlikely to have aided his performance. Armstrong finished the season on 18 goals, not enough to save the Eagles from relegation.

His 23 Premier League goals for Palace were the club record until Wilfried Zaha surpassed him in August 2018.

=== Tottenham Hotspur ===
After interest from FA Cup holders Everton, Armstrong joined Tottenham Hotspur for a fee of £4.5 million in June 1995, replacing Bayern Munich-bound Jürgen Klinsmann. With the funds coming from a new kit deal and the sales of Klinsmann, Gica Popescu and Ilie Dumitrescu, this made him both Tottenham's most expensive signing, until Les Ferdinand for £6 million in 1997. It was also Palace's most expensive sale, until Andrew Johnson joined Everton for £8.6 million in 2006.

Armstrong made his Spurs debut on 19 August in a 1–1 draw at Manchester City, and scored his first goals in the form of a brace on 20 September in a 4–0 win over Chester City in the second round of the League Cup. He totalled 22 goals (15 league) in his first season, including the winner in the North London derby against Arsenal on 18 November at White Hart Lane. At the start of the season, he was criticised by tabloids for a slow start, and was seen as an inadequate replacement for Klinsmann and inferior to Arsenal's new striker Dennis Bergkamp. However, he built up a prolific partnership with Teddy Sheringham; Armstrong's two goals in a 4–1 win over Manchester United on 1 January 1996 brought their combined total to 23 goals.

On 28 December 1998, Armstrong scored a late hat-trick in a 4–1 home win over Everton, and when he was substituted at the end of the game his teammate David Ginola got in his way to bow down to him. He scored five times in their League Cup run that season, including two in a 3–1 win over Manchester United in the quarter-finals, but was unused in the final at Wembley Stadium which Spurs won over Leicester City.

Armstrong's 2000–01 season was disrupted by frequent groin injuries. Two ankle operations meant he missed the entirety of the following season.

=== Final years ===
On 28 August 2002, Armstrong signed for Bolton Wanderers in a deal that would see him earn a low wage until his first-team debut, estimated at two months away due to fitness. His only appearance came on 2 October, in a 1–0 home defeat to Bury in the second round of the League Cup, lasting just 53 minutes before being substituted for Henrik Pedersen.

Armstrong returned to Wrexham aged 32 on 4 July 2003, signing a three-year deal ahead of their return to the Second Division.

== International career ==
Towards the start of his professional career, Armstrong was tracked by Wales, and was called up by Nigeria ahead of the 1994 FIFA World Cup, but turned them down in hope of representing England. Republic of Ireland managers Jack Charlton and Mick McCarthy also tried to enlist Armstrong in the late 1990s; he later revealed that his Tottenham contract said that he could only play for England to avoid limits on foreign players in European fixtures.

Armstrong played his only international match on 10 May 1994, a 3–2 friendly win for England B over Northern Ireland at Hillsborough. He came on as a 65th-minute substitute for Chris Sutton.

He received a call up to the England squad by Kevin Keegan to play Poland in March 1999, but was ultimately never capped for the senior side.

== Personal life ==
In July 2016, Armstrong was arrested for possession of cannabis, cocaine and ecstasy after a raid in West Kensington. He pleaded guilty to possession of Class A and Class B drugs at Hammersmith Magistrates' Court and was fined £375. He denied having a drug problem.

In July 2021, Armstrong caused £2,000 of criminal damage and assaulted staff at a Tesco in Chelsea, London. The staff had refused to open for him to buy cigarettes. He admitted to the offences at Westminster Magistrates' Court the following January. In March, he received an 18-month community order and treatment for his drug and alcohol problems, as well as court costs of £180.

== Career statistics ==
Source: Chris Armstrong at the English National Football Archive (subscription required)

Appearances and goals by club, season and competition
Club	Season	League			FA Cup		League Cup		Other		Total	
Club	Season	Division	Apps	Goals	Apps	Goals	Apps	Goals	Apps	Goals	Apps	Goals
Wrexham	1989–90	Fourth Division	22	3	0	0	1	0	0	0	23	3
Wrexham	1990–91	Fourth Division	38	10	1	0	2	0	6 (Note: Three appearances and two goals in Football League Trophy, one appearance and one goal in UEFA Cup Winners' Cup, two in UEFA Cup)	3	47	13
Wrexham	Total		60	13	1	0	3	0	6	3	70	16
Millwall	1991–92	Second Division	25	4	1	0	2	1	1 (Note: Appearance in Full Members' Cup)	0	29	5
Millwall	1992–93	First Division	3	1	—		2	1	—		5	2
Millwall	Total		28	5	1	0	4	2	1	0	34	7
Crystal Palace	1992–93	Premier League	35	15	1	0	—		—		36	15
Crystal Palace	1993–94	First Division	43	22	1	0	3	1	2 (Note: Appearances in Anglo-Italian Cup)	1	49	24
Crystal Palace	1994–95	Premier League	40	8	6	5	5	5	—		51	18
Crystal Palace	Total		118	45	8	5	8	6	2	1	136	57
Tottenham Hotspur	1995–96	Premier League	36	15	6	4	3	3	0	0	45	22
Tottenham Hotspur	1996–97	Premier League	12	5	0	0	3	1	—		15	6
Tottenham Hotspur	1997–98	Premier League	19	5	1	0	2	1	—		22	6
Tottenham Hotspur	1998–99	Premier League	34	7	5	0	5	5	—		44	12
Tottenham Hotspur	1999–2000	Premier League	31	14	2	0	2	0	3 (Note: Appearances in UEFA Cup)	0	38	14
Tottenham Hotspur	2000–01	Premier League	9	2	0	0	0	0	—		9	2
Tottenham Hotspur	2001–02	Premier League	0	0	0	0	0	0	—		0	0
Tottenham Hotspur	Total		141	48	14	4	15	10	3	0	173	62
Bolton Wanderers	2002–03	Premier League	0	0	0	0	1	0	—		1	0
Wrexham	2003–04	Second Division	26	5	1	1	0	0	1 (Note: Appearance(s) in Football League Trophy)	1	28	7
Wrexham	2004–05	League One	33	8	2	0	1	0	1	0	37	8
Wrexham	Total		59	13	3	1	1	0	2	1	65	15
Career total			406	124	27	10	32	18	14	5	479	157

== Honours ==
Crystal Palace

- Football League First Division: 1993–94

Tottenham Hotspur

- Football League Cup: 1998–99

Individual

- PFA Team of the Year: 1993–94 First Division

== See also ==
- List of sportspeople sanctioned for doping offences
