= John Scales =

English footballer

Personal information
- Full name: John Robert Scales
- Date of birth: 4 July 1966 (age 60)
- Place of birth: Harrogate, England
- Height: 6 ft 0 in (1.83 m)
- Position: Defender

Senior career*
| Years | Team | Apps | (Gls) |
| 1984–1985 | Leeds United | 0 | (0) |
| 1985–1987 | Bristol Rovers | 72 | (2) |
| 1987–1994 | Wimbledon | 240 | (11) |
| 1994–1996 | Liverpool | 65 | (2) |
| 1996–2000 | Tottenham Hotspur | 33 | (0) |
| 2000–2001 | Ipswich Town | 2 | (0) |
| Total | | 412 | (15) |

International career
| 1994 | England B | 2 | (1) |
| 1995 | England | 3 | (0) |
- * Club domestic league appearances and goals

John Robert Scales (born 4 July 1966) is an English former professional footballer who played as a central defender from 1984 to 2001.

He notably played in the Premier League for Wimbledon, Liverpool, Tottenham Hotspur and Ipswich Town as well as playing in the Football League for Bristol Rovers. He was capped three times by England.

== Club career ==
=== Bristol Rovers ===
Scales started his career at Leeds United and Bristol Rovers before earning a move to Wimbledon in July 1987.

=== Wimbledon ===
Scales became part of the Wimbledon Crazy Gang that graced the top flight of English football and that won the FA Cup in the famous 1988 final against future club Liverpool. He played as a substitute in the final, though unusually playing as a forward after coming on for striker Terry Gibson. He made his debut for the club in a 1–0 First Division defeat to Watford, who had just appointed former Wimbledon boss Dave Bassett as their new manager, on 15 August 1987. He was soon a regular member of the side, and over the next seven years would make 240 league appearances for the club, scoring 11 goals, including five in the 1988–89 season.

=== Liverpool ===
Scales made a £3.5 million transfer to Liverpool in September 1994. He says that the highlight of his time there was his three England caps and the game at Anfield when they beat Newcastle United 4–3 in April 1996. Scales has said that although the Liverpool team he was in had the talent to win the Premier League they lacked the focus and discipline needed to be champions, though they did win the Football League Cup against Bolton Wanderers in his first season there and were FA Cup finalists a year later, finishing fourth and then third in the Premier League.

=== Tottenham Hotspur ===
In 1996, Liverpool accepted offers from Leeds United and Tottenham Hotspur for Scales, who decided to again join up with Spurs manager Gerry Francis who he had played for whilst at Bristol Rovers. Scales had a disappointing time at Tottenham Hotspur due to injuries, being in and out of the team and the instability of the club. He scored once during his time at Tottenham with his goal coming, coincidentally, against former club Liverpool in the 1998–99 Football League Cup, which Tottenham went on to win. However, he missed the 1999 Football League Cup final with a calf injury that he picked up in February 1999.

=== Ipswich Town ===
In July 2000, Scales signed for newly promoted Ipswich Town but made only two Premier League appearances before succumbing to injury and was released in the summer of 2001.

== International career ==
Scales won three caps for the England national team in 1995. All his appearances came in the Umbro Cup, starting games against Japan and Brazil, and came on as a substitute in the 80th minute against Sweden. He was also a member of England's squad for Le Tournoi de France but did not play.

== Coaching career ==
Scales was England coach for the Danone Nations Cup in 2007. Later in his career, Scales went on to coach the England beach soccer team.

== Personal life ==
As a schoolboy, Scales attended Rossett School from 1978 to 1983. Scales is a member of the Wimbledon Old Players Association and has played for the AFC Wimbledon Masters XI. Scales was featured on the Sky Sports series Where are they now?, he is now a company chairman with an events management company "Be Sport". His company organises tournaments for schools. He has also co-commentated on football matches for BBC Radio 5 Live.

== Honours ==
Wimbledon

- FA Cup: 1987–88

Liverpool

- Football League Cup: 1994–95
- FA Cup runner-up: 1995–96

England

- Tournoi de France: 1997
- Umbro Cup runner-up: 1995
