= 1999 Football League Cup final =

English football match

- Match programme cover
- Event: 1998–99 Football League Cup
Leicester City	Tottenham Hotspur
0	1
- Date: 21 March 1999
- Venue: Wembley Stadium, London
- Man of the Match: Allan Nielsen (Tottenham Hotspur)
- Referee: Terry Heilbron (County Durham)
- Attendance: 77,892
- Weather: Rain

The 1999 Football League Cup final was played between Tottenham Hotspur and Leicester City, at Wembley on Sunday, 21 March 1999.

Tottenham won the game, and their third League Cup, with an injury-time diving header from Allan Nielsen after a cross from the right from Steffen Iversen had been blocked by goalkeeper Kasey Keller. Justin Edinburgh became the last player to be sent off at the old Wembley, after angrily waving his arm towards Robbie Savage following a particularly tough Savage challenge. In the last few minutes of the game, Ramon Vega made a last-ditch sliding tackle to deny Emile Heskey a goal for Leicester, after Ian Walker rushed off his line, and Allan Nielsen scored a diving header.

== Road to Wembley ==
=== Leicester City ===
Round 2, 1st leg: Leicester City 3–0 Chesterfield

Round 2, 2nd leg: Chesterfield 1–3 Leicester City

Round 3: Charlton Athletic 1–2 Leicester City

Round 4: Leicester City 2–1 Leeds United

Quarter-final: Leicester City 1–0 Blackburn Rovers

Semi-final, 1st leg: Sunderland 1–2 Leicester City

Semi-final, 2nd leg: Leicester City 1–1 Sunderland

=== Tottenham Hotspur ===
Round 2, 1st leg: Brentford 2–3 Tottenham Hotspur

Round 2, 2nd leg: Tottenham Hotspur 3–2 Brentford

Round 3: Northampton Town 1–3 Tottenham Hotspur

Round 4: Liverpool 1–3 Tottenham Hotspur

Quarter-final: Tottenham Hotspur 3–1 Manchester United

Semi-final, 1st leg: Tottenham Hotspur 0–0 Wimbledon

Semi-final, 2nd leg: Wimbledon 0–1 Tottenham Hotspur

== Match details ==
21 March 1999
15:00 GMT

Leicester City	0–1	Tottenham Hotspur
	Report	Nielsen 90'

Wembley, London
Attendance: 77,892
Referee: Terry Heilbron (County Durham)

Leicester City	Tottenham Hotspur

GK	1	(United States) Kasey Keller
CB	18	(Scotland) Matt Elliott	Yellow card
CB	5	(England) Steve Walsh (c)
CB	4	(Northern Ireland) Gerry Taggart
RM	6	(Turkey) Muzzy Izzet
CM	14	(Wales) Robbie Savage	Yellow card	(substituted off) 90'
CM	7	(Northern Ireland) Neil Lennon
LM	11	(England) Steve Guppy
RF	27	(England) Tony Cottee
CF	9	(England) Emile Heskey		(substituted off) 74'
LF	19	(England) Robert Ullathorne
Substitutes:
GK	22	(France) Pegguy Arphexad
DF	15	(Sweden) Pontus Kåmark
MF	16	(Scotland) Stuart Campbell
MF	37	(Greece) Theodoros Zagorakis		(substituted on) 90'
FW	20	(England) Ian Marshall		(substituted on) 74'
Manager:
(Northern Ireland) Martin O'Neill

GK	1	(England) Ian Walker
RB	2	(Republic of Ireland) Stephen Carr
CB	15	(Switzerland) Ramon Vega	Yellow card
CB	23	(England) Sol Campbell (c)
LB	12	(England) Justin Edinburgh	(red card) 63'
DM	4	(Germany) Steffen Freund
RM	14	(France) David Ginola		(substituted off) 90'
CM	6	(Denmark) Allan Nielsen
LM	9	(England) Darren Anderton
CF	18	(Norway) Steffen Iversen
CF	10	(England) Les Ferdinand
Substitutes:
GK	13	(Norway) Espen Baardsen
DF	32	(England) Luke Young
MF	20	(Portugal) José Dominguez
MF	22	(England) Andy Sinton		(substituted on) 90'
FW	11	(England) Chris Armstrong
Manager:
(Scotland) George Graham
