= José Dominguez =

Portuguese footballer & manager (born 1974)

Personal information
- Full name: José Manuel Martins Dominguez
- Date of birth: 16 February 1974 (age 52)
- Place of birth: Lisbon, Portugal
- Height: 1.65 m (5 ft 5 in)
- Position: Winger

Youth career
- 1983–1984: Domingos Sávio
- 1985–1992: Benfica

Senior career*
Years	Team	Apps	(Gls)
1992–1994	Benfica	0	(0)
1992–1993	→ Sintrense (loan)	12	(1)
1993–1994	→ Fafe (loan)	13	(2)
1994–1995	Birmingham City	35	(3)
1995–1997	Sporting CP	62	(4)
1997–2000	Tottenham Hotspur	45	(4)
2000–2004	1. FC Kaiserslautern	56	(5)
2004	Al Ahli (Doha)		
2005	Vasco da Gama	7	(0)
Total		230	(19)

International career
1994–1995	Portugal U21	8	(0)
1995–1996	Portugal	3	(0)

Managerial career
- 2010–2012: União Leiria (youth)
- 2012: União Leiria
- 2012: Sporting CP B (assistant)
- 2012–2013: Sporting CP B
- 2014: Real Cartagena
- 2015: Recreativo
- 2021: Gaziantep (assistant)
- 2023–2024: APOEL (assistant)
- 2024: APOEL
- * Club domestic league appearances and goals

José Manuel Martins Dominguez (born 16 February 1974) is a Portuguese professional football manager and former player.

As a player, he was a diminutive winger with above-average technical skills and speed. He started playing professional football not in his own country but in England with Birmingham City. After two years with Sporting CP, he returned to England for three years with Tottenham Hotspur, then spent another three with German club 1. FC Kaiserslautern and had short spells in Qatar and Brazil.

Dominguez represented Portugal at youth level, then won three caps for the senior team in the 90s.

== Club career ==
=== Early years and Sporting CP ===
Born in Lisbon and raised in the Bairro Alto neighbourhood, Dominguez had an unassuming youth spell at his hometown club Benfica, then played for a year with amateurs Sintrense also in the area. After a few months at Fafe he had his first taste of professional football, joining Football League Second Division club Birmingham City in March 1994 and being relegated in his first season.

Following Luís Figo's departure to Barcelona, Sporting CP chose Dominguez as his replacement, and he went on to spend two solid seasons at the latter side, albeit with no silverware.

=== Tottenham Hotspur ===
Tottenham Hotspur, coached by Gerry Francis, returned Dominguez to England in August 1997, for £1.6 million. He made his debut in the Premier League against Derby County at the end of that month, winning a penalty after coming on as a second-half substitute; however, despite being at White Hart Lane for over three years, his appearances were limited: he started regularly under Francis, but came more regularly off the bench during Christian Gross's tenure as manager.

Dominguez won the 1998–99 League Cup with Spurs as an unused substitute in the final, but fell out of favour during the following season under George Graham, who demoted him to the reserves. He only played two league matches for the first team, both as substitute.

=== Later career ===
Dominguez signed for 1. FC Kaiserslautern in November 2000, for £250,000. He scored in only his second Bundesliga game, a 4–2 loss at Bayer Leverkusen, but his performances were also erratic, mainly due to coaching changes and personal problems; in his last season he scored one goal in 26 matches, but the team finished just one place above relegation due to financial irregularities.

After a brief spell in Qatar with Al Ahli, Dominguez moved in 2005 to Brazil's Vasco da Gama. After only three starts in 11 competitive appearances, he was not offered a new contract and left, retiring aged 31.

== International career ==
While at Sporting, Dominguez won three caps for Portugal. In a more important role, he helped the Olympic team to a fourth-place finish at the 1996 Summer Olympics in Atlanta; that squad also included four other Sporting graduates – Luís Andrade, Dani, Emílio Peixe and Hugo Porfírio.

== Coaching career ==
Dominguez spent two years coaching União de Leiria's youth sides. On 14 March 2012 he became the first team's fourth coach of the campaign, replacing the fired Manuel Cajuda. In 2012–13, he worked with Sporting's reserves in the Segunda Liga.

In late December 2013, Dominguez was appointed at Real Cartagena in Colombia as part of an agreement between that club and Sporting. On 24 March 2015, he was named at the helm of Recreativo de Huelva, replacing Juan Manuel Pavón. He remained at the club after their relegation to Segunda División B and was dismissed on 12 October, having won two and drawn three of the first eight games of the season.

Dominguez later worked as assistant to his former Sporting teammate Ricardo Sá Pinto, at Gaziantep in Turkey and APOEL. After helping the latter to the Cypriot First Division title in 2023–24, he was appointed their manager in August 2024, being relieved of his duties two months later due to poor results.

== Style of play ==
Standing at 165 centimeters, Dominguez was one of the shortest players to have ever played in the Premier League. In his prime, he was noted for his pace, acceleration, agility, technique, flair and dribbling, and while at Benfica he often drew comparisons to Paulo Futre.

== Personal life ==
Dominguez married a woman from Lagos, Algarve, being deeply familiar with that town of southern mainland Portugal.

== Honours ==
Birmingham City

- Football League Second Division: 1994–95

Sporting CP

- Supertaça Cândido de Oliveira: 1995

Tottenham Hotspur

- Football League Cup: 1998–99
