= Espen Baardsen =

Norwegian footballer (born 1977)

Personal information
- Date of birth: 7 December 1977 (age 48)
- Place of birth: San Rafael, United States
- Height: 1.95 m (6 ft 5 in)
- Position: Goalkeeper

Youth career
- 1995–1996: San Francisco United All Blacks

Senior career*
Years	Team	Apps	(Gls)
1996–2000	Tottenham Hotspur	23	(0)
2000–2002	Watford	41	(0)
2002–2003	Everton	1	(0)
Total		65	(0)

International career
1998–2000	Norway	4	(0)
- * Club domestic league appearances and goals

Espen Baardsen (born 7 December 1977) is a former professional footballer who played as a goalkeeper.

He began his career with Tottenham Hotspur, where he made his debut aged 19. He left the club for £1.25m in 2000 for Watford, where he spent two years before leaving and signing a short-term contract with Everton. After making one appearance, he voluntarily retired from football upon the expiration of his contract, aged 25.

Born in the United States to Norwegian parents, he was selected for the USA under-18 national team before switching his international eligibility to Norway because of his dual nationality.

== Club career ==
In 1995 Baardsen was spotted by English team Tottenham Hotspur while he was playing for the San Francisco United All Blacks of the USISL. Tottenham offered him a contract. He made his debut for the team in the spring of 1997 against Liverpool at Anfield. Despite good performances, including a 0–0 draw away to rivals Arsenal, he was unable to become the team's first-choice keeper, but finished his time at the North London club with a League Cup winners medal from 1999. Spurs played eight matches en route to winning the cup and Baardsen started three of those matches (Ian Walker started four and Hans Segers one).

In 2000 Baardsen, seeking first-team football, signed for Watford for a fee of £1.25 million. However, towards the end of the 2000–01 season he lost his place in the team to veteran Alec Chamberlain. Although he returned to the side under new manager Gianluca Vialli in 2001–02, and saved a Mark Robins penalty to help his team beat Rotherham United 3–2 in an early season game, he was again displaced by Chamberlain.

In 2002, he had a short spell at Everton. In his sole game for the club he conceded 4 goals in a 4–3 loss to his former club Tottenham Hotspur.

Claiming to have lost interest in the game, Baardsen retired from football aged only 25.

== International career ==
At international level, Baardsen played more than 20 matches for the Norwegian under-21 team, and also won four caps for the senior side. Baardsen won a bronze medal in the 1998 UEFA European Under-21 Championship in Romania, during which he received the "Best Goalkeeper of the Tournament" award. He made his debut for Norway in a September 1998 European Championship qualifying match against Latvia. Before that match, he was already part of Norway's 1998 World Cup squad as third-choice goalkeeper, despite the fact that he had never lived in Norway in his entire life. His last international match was a friendly against Iceland in January 2000.

== Personal life ==
After retiring, Baardsen went travelling around the world for a year, before studying for a degree at the Open University. He is currently a partner and fund manager for a London-based asset management company. He is a frequent guest on the business television network CNBC.

== Career statistics ==
(C.S. = Clean sheets) (Con. = Conceded)

Club	Season	League	League			FA Cup			League Cup			Total		
Club	Season	League	Apps	C.S.	Con.	Apps	C.S.	Con.	Apps	C.S.	Con.	Apps	C.S.	Con.
Tottenham Hotspur	1996–97	Premier League	2	0	4	0	0	0	0	0	0	2	0	4
Tottenham Hotspur	1997–98	Premier League	9	3	10	3	0	5	0	0	0	12	3	15
Tottenham Hotspur	1998–99	Premier League	12	5	16	0	0	0	3	0	4	15	5	20
Tottenham Hotspur	1999–2000	Premier League	0	0	0	0	0	0	0	0	0	0	0	0
Watford	2000–01	First Division	27	5	45	0	0	0	2	2	0	29	5	45
Watford	2001–02	First Division	14	2	25	0	0	0	3	1	3	17	3	28
Everton (loan)	2002–03	Premier League	1	0	4	0	0	0	0	0	0	1	0	4
Career total			65	15	104	3	0	5	8	3	7	76	18	116

== Honors ==
Tottenham Hotspur

- Football League Cup: 1998–99
