= Montserrat Football Association =

Sport governing body

CONCACAF
- Short name: Montserrat FA
- Founded: 1994
- Headquarters: Plymouth
- FIFA affiliation: 1996
- CONCACAF affiliation: 1994 (Associate member), 1996
- President: John Krishnadath

The Montserrat Football Association (MFA) is the governing body of football in the British Overseas Territory of Montserrat. It is in charge of the Montserrat national football team and is also responsible for the league in Montserrat, the Montserrat Championship.

== History ==
Montserrat played their first match in 1991. They were granted associate membership to CONCACAF in 1994, and full membership to CONCACAF and FIFA in 1996.

In 2011, association president Vincent Cassell and his secretary Tandika Hughes were suspended by FIFA for 60 days and 15 days respectively for bribery, in what would later become the 2015 FIFA corruption case. In 2022, Cassell and Hughes were subject to a criminal investigation for the period 2013–2018, for tax offences and conspiracy to cheat the public revenue. Criminal proceedings began in December 2025, and Cassell stepped down as President after 30 years in the role. Cassell and Hughes both pled guilty to multiple tax offences, after which the prosecution did not pursue further convictions for cheating the Inland Revenue.

Subsequently, in January 2026 FIFA declared the MFA to be in a "state of exceptional crisis and institutional paralysis". In collaboration with CONCACAF, FIFA appointed a 'normalisation committee' to run the MFA, who would remain in place no later than 31 January 2027.

== Association staff ==
As of August 2026:

Name	Position	Source
(Suriname) John Krishnadath	President	
(Montserrat) Ottley Laborde	Vice President	
(Montserrat) Kenneth Lee	Vice President	
(Montserrat) Thandie Williams	Acting General Secretary	
(Barbados) Ytannia Wiggins	Treasurer	
n/a	Technical Director	
(Spain) Gabriel Calderon	Team Coach (Men's)	
n/a	Team Coach (Women's)	
n/a	Media/Communications Manager	
n/a	Futsal Coordinator	
n/a	Referee Coordinator	
