= Rory Allen =

English footballer (born 1977)

Personal information
- Full name: Rory Allen
- Date of birth: 17 October 1977 (age 49)
- Place of birth: Beckenham, England
- Position: Striker

Senior career*
Years	Team	Apps	(Gls)
1995–1999	Tottenham Hotspur	21	(2)
1998	→ Luton Town (loan)	8	(6)
1999–2002	Portsmouth	15	(3)
Total		44	(11)
- * Club domestic league appearances and goals

Rory Allen (born 17 October 1977) is an English former professional footballer. He now works for the Civil Service.

== Club career ==
=== Early career ===
A striker, Allen made his professional football debut for Tottenham Hotspur on 4 September 1996 as a substitute in a 1–0 defeat at Wimbledon (aged 18). He went on to score four times in 28 games for Spurs, and started the third round FA Cup tie in 1997 against Manchester United alongside Neale Fenn. Two of his four goals came in the league, against Newcastle and Manchester United, also scoring a brace against Preston North End in the League Cup. Allen was sent on loan to Luton Town in 1997, scoring six goals in eight appearances in what was then Division Two (the third tier of English football).

=== Portsmouth ===
Portsmouth paid Spurs a club record £1,000,000 for him in July 1999, as he became Pompey's first million-pound signing. He scored his first goal for Portsmouth on 15 August 1999 in a match against Wolves. The following week, he made it two goals in a week, scoring in a 2–0 victory at home to Stockport. He injured his ankle in September 1999, lasting only 24 minutes of a league match against Ipswich. He wouldn't play again until making an appearance as a substitute in March 2000. Allen scored his third Portsmouth goal against QPR in May 2000, equalising in the 53rd minute but with Portsmouth finally losing the match 3–1.

He struggled for match fitness, and missed the whole of the 2000–01 and 2001–02 seasons due to knee problems. He scored in a pre-season friendly match against Spanish side Alavés in August 2002, but made no further competitive appearances. He left the club in November 2002, handing in a letter of resignation with eight months of his contract remaining. Having already undergone eight operations to his ankles and knees over the course of his career, this signalled his retirement from football aged just 25. Manager Harry Redknapp did not know that Allen was going to leave, receiving the resignation letter after Allen had already left the country to watch The Ashes in Australia.

== Personal life ==
In 2000, Allen was arrested and fined alongside Portsmouth goalkeeper Aaron Flahavan after he admitted to being abusive towards police officers following a drinking session.
