= Andy Sinton =

English footballer and manager

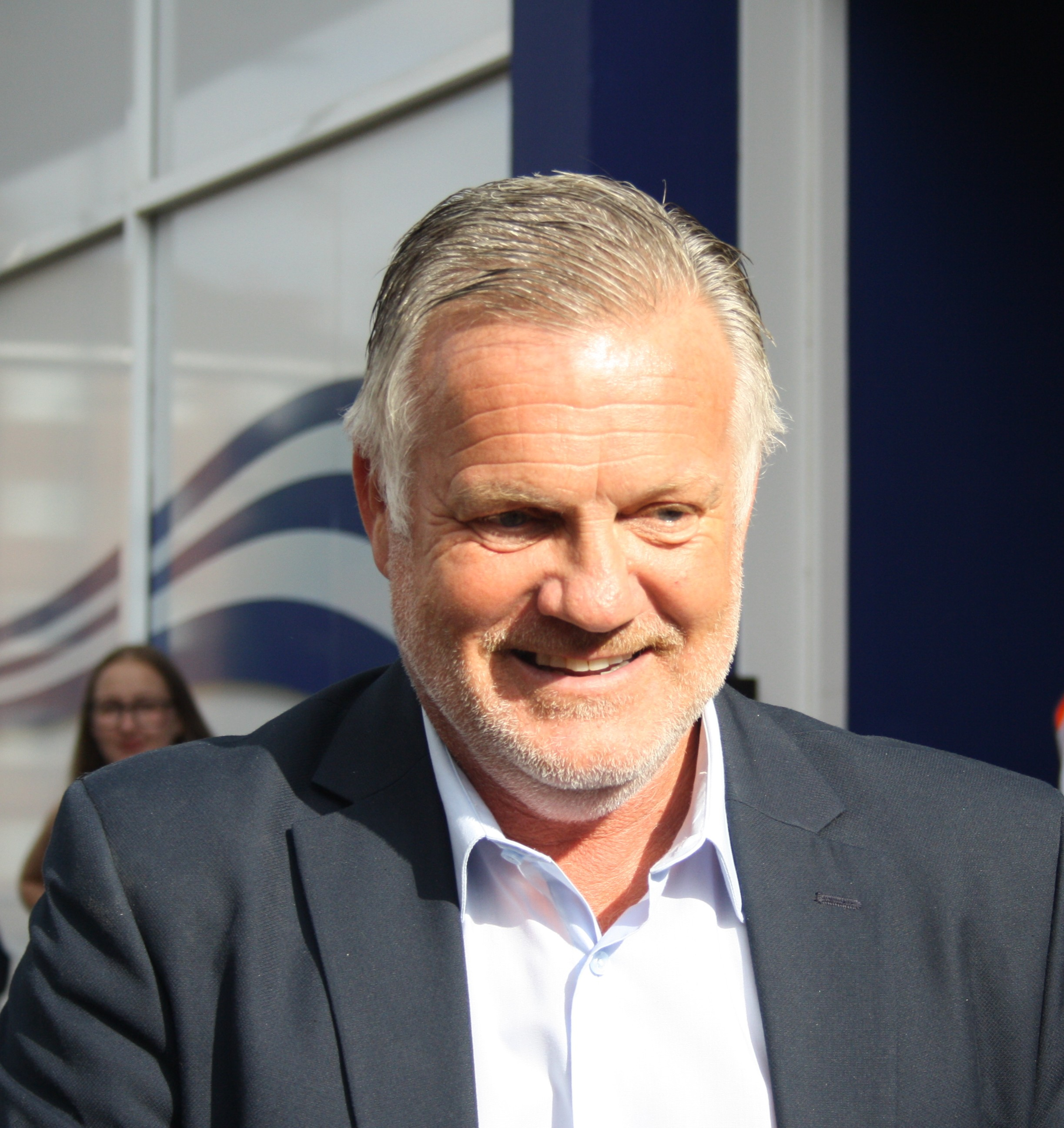
- Sinton in 2025

Personal information
- Full name: Andrew Sinton
- Date of birth: 19 March 1966 (age 60)
- Place of birth: Cramlington, England
- Height: 1.73 m (5 ft 8 in)
- Position: Left midfielder

Team information
- Current team: Queens Park Rangers (Club Ambassador)

Senior career*
| Years | Team | Apps | (Gls) |
| 1982–1985 | Cambridge United | 93 | (3) |
| 1985–1989 | Brentford | 149 | (28) |
| 1989–1993 | Queens Park Rangers | 161 | (22) |
| 1993–1996 | Sheffield Wednesday | 62 | (3) |
| 1996–1999 | Tottenham Hotspur | 83 | (6) |
| 1999–2002 | Wolverhampton Wanderers | 71 | (3) |
| 2002–2004 | Burton Albion | 38 | (2) |
| 2004 | Bromsgrove Rovers | 6 | (0) |
| 2004–2007 | Fleet Town | 21 | (1) |
| Total | | 684 | (68) |

International career
| 1990 | England Schoolboys | | |
| 1990–1992 | England B | 3 | (0) |
| 1990 | Football League XI | 1 | (0) |
| 1991–1993 | England | 12 | (0) |

Managerial career
- 2005–2010: Fleet Town
- 2010–2013: AFC Telford United
- * Club domestic league appearances and goals

Andrew Sinton (born 19 March 1966) is an English football manager and former professional footballer, who is club ambassador for Queens Park Rangers.

As a player, he was a left midfielder who notably played in the Premier League for Queens Park Rangers, Sheffield Wednesday and Tottenham Hotspur. He also played in the Football League for Cambridge United, Brentford and Wolverhampton Wanderers before finishing his career in non-league with Burton Albion, Bromsgrove Rovers and Fleet Town. He earned 12 caps playing as an international footballer for England. He was described as "a hard-working midfielder with a good footballing brain and who created many goals".

Following retirement, Sinton managed non-league side Fleet Town for five seasons, then AFC Telford United for three seasons, where he won promotion with the club to the Conference National.

== Club career ==
Sinton was a schoolboy footballer, playing for the England Under 15 team. He signed for Cambridge United on leaving school, and made his debut aged 16 years 228 days on 2 November 1982. He is the youngest player to play a league game for Cambridge, and is one of only two product of the club's youth team to become a full England international: John Ruddy of Norwich City followed Sinton to this accolade in 2012. Sinton was the outstanding player in a poor Cambridge side, which suffered successive relegations in 1983–84 and 1984–85.

He was signed by Brentford in 1985 for just £25,000. He was signed for QPR by Trevor Francis in 1989 for £350,000 and went on to play 160 league games, scoring 22 goals including the first goal in the notable 4–1 QPR victory at Old Trafford in 1992. Sinton played for QPR in the first year of the Premiership, where he scored a hat-trick in a 4–2 win against Everton on 28 December 1992, before moving to Sheffield Wednesday for a then club record £2.75million in August 1993.

He spent two and a half years at Hillsborough but returned to London early in 1996 to link up with former Rangers boss Gerry Francis at Tottenham Hotspur. He came on as an 89th-minute substitute, for David Ginola, in the 1999 Football League Cup Final that Spurs won 1–0 over Leicester City.

He made his last Premiership appearance for Tottenham Hotspur in 1999, before spending three years with Wolverhampton Wanderers and then signing for Nigel Clough's Burton Albion in August 2002.

== International career ==
On the international front, Sinton made his England debut in a 1–1 draw in Poland in November 1991 and went on to acquire 12 caps – including two during a disappointing European Championships campaign in 1992. He played David Platt through on goal for England's penalty claim that was turned down in their 2–0 defeat against the Netherlands in Rotterdam in October 1993, towards the end of Graham Taylor's reign. His last appearance for his country came the following month, in the 7–1 rout of San Marino in Bologna. He also played for England Schoolboys, England B and the Football League XI.

== Management career ==
Sinton was appointed manager of Isthmian League Division One outfit Fleet Town in summer 2005, having spent the previous season as the club's Football Development Officer. On 26 May 2010 it was announced that, from a large field of applicants, Sinton had been appointed manager of A.F.C. Telford United in Conference North. In his first season in charge, he led them to a second-place finish in the league and clinched promotion to the Conference via the playoffs. In his second season at the club, he kept them out of the Conference National's relegation zone all season and secured safety with two games still remaining. On 31 January 2013, it was announced that Sinton had left A.F.C. Telford United by mutual consent after a 16-match winless run, the worst in the club's history.

== Personal life ==
In May 2015 Sinton was back in football when he was appointed as former club Queens Park Rangers first club ambassador. His role includes attending games and fan events, working with commercial partners as well as with the club's Media and Communications, Marketing and Club in the Community teams to help promote Queen's Park Rangers. He was a driving force in creating 'Forever Rs', the club's former players association, in 2016.

On 24 August 2025 it was reported that Sinton had suffered a heart attack that was followed by hospital admission.

== Honours ==
=== As a player ===
Tottenham Hotspur

- Football League Cup: 1998–99

Individual

- Brentford Supporters' Player of the Year: 1986–87, 1987–88

=== As a manager ===
AFC Telford United

- Conference North play-offs: 2011
