= Danny Hill (footballer) =

English footballer

Personal information
- Full name: Daniel Ronald Louis Hill
- Date of birth: 1 October 1974 (age 52)
- Place of birth: Enfield, England
- Position: Midfielder

Youth career
- 1988–1992: Tottenham Hotspur

Senior career*
Years	Team	Apps	(Gls)
1992–1998	Tottenham Hotspur	10	(0)
1995	→ Birmingham City (loan)	5	(0)
1996	→ Watford (loan)	1	(0)
1998	→ Cardiff City (loan)	7	(0)
1998	Oxford United	9	(0)
1998–2001	Cardiff City	58	(4)
2001–2004	Dagenham & Redbridge	79	(7)
2004	Hornchurch		
2005–2006	Heybridge Swifts		
2006	Leyton		

International career
1995	England U21	4	(0)
- * Club domestic league appearances and goals

Daniel Ronald Louis Hill (born 1 October 1974) is an English former footballer who played as a midfielder. He made 90 appearances in the Premier League and Football League playing for Tottenham Hotspur, Birmingham City, Watford, Cardiff City and Oxford United, as well as playing non-league football for teams including Dagenham & Redbridge, Hornchurch, Heybridge Swifts and Leyton. He represented England at youth and under-21 level.

At Tottenham he put in a memorable performance as his side played rivals Arsenal at Highbury on the last day of the 1992–93 Premier League season; Hill had a hand in all three goals as Tottenham won 3–1.
