= Allan Nielsen =

Danish footballer (born 1971)

Personal information
- Date of birth: 13 March 1971 (age 55)
- Place of birth: Esbjerg, Denmark
- Height: 5 ft 8 in (1.73 m)
- Position: Midfielder

Youth career
- SGI
- 1989: Esbjerg

Senior career*
Years	Team	Apps	(Gls)
1989–1991	Bayern Munich	1	(0)
1991	Sion	0	(0)
1991–1993	Odense	55	(9)
1994–1995	Copenhagen	26	(3)
1995–1996	Brøndby	42	(11)
1996–2000	Tottenham Hotspur	97	(12)
2000	→ Wolverhampton Wanderers (loan)	7	(2)
2000–2003	Watford	100	(19)
2003–2004	Herfølge	18	(3)
Total		346	(59)

International career
1995–2002	Denmark	44	(7)

Managerial career
- 2003–2004: Herfølge (assistant)
- 2004–2005: Herfølge
- * Club domestic league appearances and goals

Allan Nielsen (Danish pronunciation: [ˈæ.læn ˈne̝l.sn̩]; born 13 March 1971) is a Danish former professional footballer who played as a midfielder. His most notable period of football was four years at English Premier League club Tottenham Hotspur with whom he won the 1999 League Cup, scoring the winning goal.

He was also an integral part of the Denmark national team from 1996 to 2001, playing a total of 44 matches and scoring seven goals. He competed for Denmark in the international 1996 European Championship (Euro 1996), 1998 FIFA World Cup and Euro 2000 tournaments.

== Career ==
Nielsen was born in Esbjerg, Denmark. Having never played a senior match for Esbjerg, whom he joined from the academy of Sædding-Guldager Idrætsforening (SGI), he moved abroad in 1989 to play for German Bundesliga team Bayern Munich at the age of 18. In his three years at the club, he played only six minutes in a single game in May 1991, as he came on as a substitute in a 7–3 win against Hertha BSC. Failing to break through at Bayern Munich, he left the club in the summer 1991. Nielsen initially signed a three-year contract with Sion in June 1991, but he never played a game for the club. He swiftly moved back to Denmark, to play with OB in the Danish Superliga championship, where he debuted in September 1991.

At Odense, he was a part of the team that won the 1993 Danish Cup and he was then brought to league rivals Copenhagen in 1994. He played a single season for the club, where he was team captain, before he moved to main rivals Brøndby in 1995. In his year at Brøndby, the club won the 1995–96 Danish Superliga championship, and Nielsen was named the Brøndby 1995 Player of the Year. He was called up for the Danish national team under national manager Richard Møller Nielsen. Nielsen made his debut against Armenia on 16 August 1995. He came on as a substitute and following 45 seconds on the pitch, he scored the second goal in Denmark's 2–0 win. He was called up to represent Denmark at the Euro '96 tournament hosted by England, where he scored one goal in his only match, the 3–0 win against Turkey.

After Euro 1996, Brøndby received a transfer fee of £1.65 million, when Nielsen moved to England to play for Premier League club Tottenham Hotspur. He played nearly 100 league matches for Tottenham, and he was a pivotal player when the club won the 1999 League Cup. In the final minute, he scored a diving header to give Tottenham a 1–0 win against Leicester City, and Nielsen was subsequently honoured as "Man of the Match". Following controversies with Tottenham manager George Graham, Nielsen moved down a league in March 2000, when he was loaned out to Wolverhampton Wanderers in the English First Division in a three-month deal. During his time at Tottenham, he represented the Danish national team in five games at the 1998 FIFA World Cup, scoring a single goal against South Africa, as well as in two games at the Euro 2000 tournament.

He permanently moved away from Tottenham after Euro 2000, in July 2000, to play for English First Division team Watford. He was signed by Watford manager Graham Taylor for £2.5 million, which at the time was the highest fee the club had ever paid for a player. After three seasons at the club, Nielsen returned to Denmark in 2003 for Superliga relegation battlers Herfølge in a role as player/assistant coach. Following a bad first half of the 2003–04 season, head coach Johnny Petersen was fired and Nielsen was promoted to player/coach, in a coaching partnership with former national team player and Esbjerg native Michael Schjønberg. They managed to finish just above the relegation zone at the end of the season. For the subsequent 2004–05 season, Nielsen decided to focus exclusively on coaching, but to no avail as Herfølge was relegated, and he announced his coaching days were over.

== Personal life ==
On 20 August 2011, Nielsen married equestrian Tina Lund. The couple moved to Dubai in 2013, but returned to Denmark in 2021.

During the COVID-19 pandemic, Nielsen drew controversy for spreading misinformation regarding COVID-19 and its vaccines.

== Career statistics ==
=== International goals ===
Scores and results list Denmark's goal tally first, score column indicates score after each Nielsen goal.

List of international goals scored by Allan Nielsen
No.	Date	Venue	Opponent	Score	Result	Competition
1	16 August 1995	Yerevan, Armenia	Armenia	2–0	2–0	Euro 1996 qualification
2	19 June 1996	Sheffield, England	Turkey	2–0	3–0	Euro 1996
3	1 September 1996	Ljubljana, Slovenia	Slovenia	1–0	2–0	1998 World Cup qualification
4	30 April 1997	Copenhagen, Denmark	Slovenia	1–0	4–0	1998 World Cup qualification
5	30 April 1997	Copenhagen, Denmark	Slovenia	4–0	4–0	1998 World Cup qualification
6	18 June 1998	Toulouse, France	South Africa	1–0	1–1	1998 World Cup
7	4 September 1999	Copenhagen, Denmark	Switzerland	1–0	2–1	Euro 2000 qualification

== Honours ==
Odense

- Danish Cup: 1992–93

Brøndby

- Danish Superliga: 1995–96

Tottenham Hotspur

- Football League Cup: 1998–99

Individual

- Alan Hardaker Trophy: 1999
- Danish Player of the Year: 1996
