= Neale Fenn =

English footballer

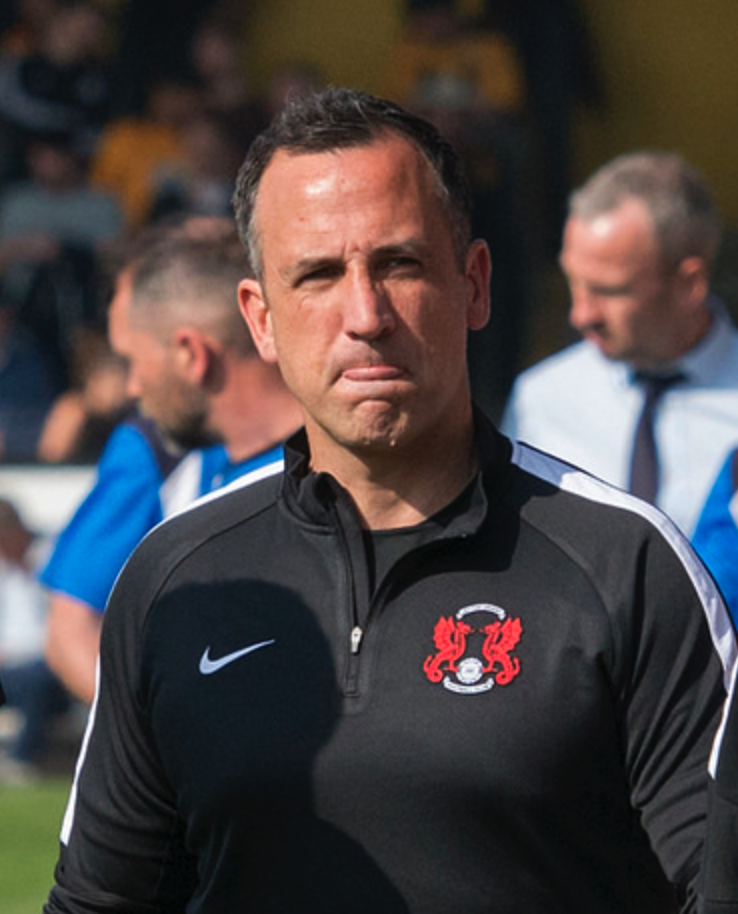
- Fenn at Leyton Orient in 2017

Personal information
- Full name: Neale Michael Charles Fenn
- Date of birth: 18 January 1977 (age 49)
- Place of birth: Edmonton, London, England
- Position: Forward

Senior career*
Years	Team	Apps	(Gls)
1995–2001	Tottenham Hotspur	8	(0)
1998	→ Leyton Orient (loan)	3	(0)
1998	→ Norwich City (loan)	7	(1)
1998	→ Swindon Town (loan)	4	(0)
1999	→ Lincoln City (loan)	4	(0)
2001–2003	Peterborough United	50	(14)
2003	Waterford United	19	(4)
2004–2006	Cork City	84	(27)
2007–2009	Bohemians	69	(5)
2010	Dundalk	22	(4)
2010	Shamrock Rovers	9	(0)
Total		281	(55)

International career
1997–1999	Republic of Ireland U21	8	(3)
1999	Republic of Ireland B	1	(2)

Managerial career
- 2017–2019: Longford Town
- 2019–2020: Cork City
- * Club domestic league appearances and goals

Neale Michael Charles Fenn (born 18 January 1977) is a former professional footballer who is also the former manager of League of Ireland clubs Longford Town and Cork City.

== Club career ==
=== Early career ===
Fenn played for Tottenham Hotspur, making his professional debut in January 1997 in a third round FA Cup tie at Manchester United alongside Rory Allen, which Spurs lost 2–0. He made his league debut, as a substitute in a 2–1 defeat at Sheffield Wednesday in April 1997.

He made only 10 appearances for Spurs, scoring once, in a League Cup tie against Carlisle in September 1997.

Fenn went on loan to several clubs including Norwich City in the First Division. At Norwich he scored once; his goal coming in a 5–0 win against Swindon Town.

=== League of Ireland career ===
Fenn signed for Waterford United in August 2003 and made his League of Ireland debut as a substitute for Daryl Murphy in a home game against Derry City.

His form and skill saw him transferring to Cork City for the 2004 season. He made a scoring debut on the opening day of the season. His three seasons at Turners Cross included his first League of Ireland Championship win in 2005.

Fenn scored two European goals for Cork. He netted at FC Nantes in the 2004 UEFA Intertoto Cup. He also scored what proved to be the all-important away goal in City's 2005–06 UEFA Cup win against Swedish side Djurgården.

Fenn was signed for Bohemians after his contract with Cork City expired in November 2006, becoming the first signing of new Bohs manager Sean Connor. After failing to score a league goal in his first season at Dalymount Park, Fenn was revitalised under the management of Pat Fenlon and played a role in Bohs' 2008 league championship win. He scored against Rhyl in the 2008 UEFA Intertoto Cup. He added another league winners medal to his collection in 2009 but was released by Bohs when his contract expired at the end of the season.

In January 2010, Fenn moved to Dundalk

He netted again in the UEFA Europa League.

On 29 July 2010, he announced his retirement from football with immediate effect for personal reasons. Fenn insisted he would not be making a return to football. "I think once you finish you might as well finish rather than making all sorts of comebacks. At the moment, I can't see myself coming back at all." However, only four days later on 3 August, he signed for Shamrock Rovers until the end of the 2010 season. He explained his reasons for joining the Hoops.

== International career ==
Neale has been capped for the Republic of Ireland at U15, U16, U18, U20, U21 and 'B' levels.

Fenn was part of Brian Kerr's 1997 under-20 squad which won bronze in the FIFA World Youth Championship in Malaysia in 1997.

In September 1997 Fenn was sent off for flooring an Icelandic opponent who laughed at his penalty miss in an under-21 international.

The same year he was called up to senior squad twice.

== Management and coaching ==
On 7 April 2017, Fenn was announced as Leyton Orient assistant manager until the end of the season.

In June 2017, Longford Town announced Fenn as their new manager, and by August 2019 he had joined League of Ireland Premier Division club Cork City as head coach.

In October 2020 Fenn stepped down as Cork City manager with the club bottom of the table with four games left in the season.
