= 1999–2000 Tottenham Hotspur F.C. season =

English football club season

Tottenham Hotspur F.C.
1999–2000 season
- Chairman: Alan Sugar
- Manager: George Graham
- Stadium: White Hart Lane
- FA Premier League: 10th
- FA Cup: Third round
- League Cup: Fourth round
- UEFA Cup: Second round
- Top goalscorer: League: Chris Armstrong/Steffen Iversen (14); All: Steffen Iversen (17)
- Average home league attendance: 34,902
Home colours	Away colours

During the 1999–2000 season, Tottenham Hotspur participated in the FA Premier League.

== Season summary ==
Tottenham Hotspur failed to make much of an impact on their return to Europe after an eight-year exile, nor were their cup exploits particularly impressive. Tenth place in the final table was a long way short of the top-five finishes attained by local rivals Arsenal and Chelsea, and manager George Graham bolstered his ranks for the 2000-01 season by paying a club record fee for Ukrainian striker Serhii Rebrov.

== Final league table ==
Pos	Team	Pld	W	D	L	GF	GA	GD	Pts	Qualification or relegation
8	Leicester City	38	16	7	15	55	55	0	55	Qualification for the UEFA Cup first round (Note: Leicester City qualified for the UEFA Cup as League Cup winners.)
9	West Ham United	38	15	10	13	52	53	−1	55	
10	Tottenham Hotspur	38	15	8	15	57	49	+8	53	
11	Newcastle United	38	14	10	14	63	54	+9	52	
12	Middlesbrough	38	14	10	14	46	52	−6	52	

Source: Premier League
Rules for classification: 1) points; 2) goal difference; 3) number of goals scored.
Notes:

Results summary

Overall								Home						Away					
Pld	W	D	L	GF	GA	GD	Pts	W	D	L	GF	GA	GD	W	D	L	GF	GA	GD
38	15	8	15	57	49	+8	53	10	3	6	40	26	+14	5	5	9	17	23	−6

Source: 1999-2000 FA Premier League table

Results by matchday

Match	1	2	3	4	5	6	7	8	9	10	11	12	13	14	15	16	17	18	19	20	21	22	23	24	25	26	27	28	29	30	31	32	33	34	35	36	37	38
Ground	A	H	H	A	H	A	H	A	H	A	H	A	H	A	A	H	A	H	A	H	A	A	H	H	A	A	H	H	A	A	H	A	H	A	H	H	A	H
Result	L	W	W	W	L	D	W	D	L	W	W	L	W	W	L	D	L	W	D	W	L	D	L	L	L	W	D	W	L	D	L	L	L	W	W	D	L	W
Position	16	2	4	1	7	10	9	7	10	7	5	7	6	6	7	7	7	6	6	6	7	7	7	7	8	9	8	6	7	8	10	11	12	10	10	9	10	10

Source: 11v11.com: 1999-2000 Tottenham Hotspur results
A = Away; H = Home; W = Win; D = Draw; L = Loss

== Results ==
Tottenham Hotspur's score comes first

=== Legend ===
Win	Draw	Loss

=== FA Premier League ===
Date	Opponent	Venue	Result	Attendance	Scorers
7 August 1999	West Ham United	A	0-1	26,010	
9 August 1999	Newcastle United	H	3-1	28,701	Iversen, Ferdinand, Sherwood
14 August 1999	Everton	H	3-2	34,539	Sherwood, Leonhardsen, Iversen
21 August 1999	Sheffield Wednesday	A	2-1	24,027	Ferdinand, Leonhardsen
28 August 1999	Leeds United	H	1-2	36,012	Sherwood
12 September 1999	Bradford City	A	1-1	18,143	Perry
19 September 1999	Coventry City	H	3-2	35,224	Iversen, Armstrong, Leonhardsen
26 September 1999	Wimbledon	A	1-1	17,368	Carr
3 October 1999	Leicester City	H	2-3	35,591	Iversen (2)
16 October 1999	Derby County	A	1-0	29,815	Armstrong
23 October 1999	Manchester United	H	3-1	36,072	Iversen, Scholes (own goal), Carr
31 October 1999	Sunderland	A	1-2	41,904	Iversen
7 November 1999	Arsenal	H	2-1	36,085	Iversen, Sherwood
20 November 1999	Southampton	A	1-0	15,248	Leonhardsen
28 November 1999	Newcastle United	A	1-2	36,460	Armstrong
6 December 1999	West Ham United	H	0-0	36,233	
18 December 1999	Middlesbrough	A	1-2	33,129	Vega
26 December 1999	Watford	H	4-0	36,089	Ginola, Iversen, Sherwood (2)
29 December 1999	Aston Villa	A	1-1	39,217	Sherwood
3 January 2000	Liverpool	H	1-0	36,044	Armstrong
12 January 2000	Chelsea	A	0-1	34,969	
15 January 2000	Everton	A	2-2	36,144	Armstrong, Ginola
22 January 2000	Sheffield Wednesday	H	0-1	35,897	
5 February 2000	Chelsea	H	0-1	36,041	
12 February 2000	Leeds United	A	0-1	40,127	
26 February 2000	Coventry City	A	1-0	23,077	Armstrong
4 March 2000	Bradford City	H	1-1	35,472	Iversen
11 March 2000	Southampton	H	7-2	36,024	Richards (own goal), Anderton, Armstrong (2), Iversen (3)
19 March 2000	Arsenal	A	1-2	38,131	Armstrong
25 March 2000	Watford	A	1-1	20,050	Armstrong
3 April 2000	Middlesbrough	H	2-3	31,796	Armstrong, Ginola
9 April 2000	Liverpool	A	0-2	44,536	
15 April 2000	Aston Villa	H	2-4	35,304	Iversen, Armstrong
19 April 2000	Leicester City	A	1-0	19,764	Ginola
22 April 2000	Wimbledon	H	2-0	33,086	Armstrong, Anderton
29 April 2000	Derby County	H	1-1	33,044	Clemence
6 May 2000	Manchester United	A	1-3	61,629	Armstrong
14 May 2000	Sunderland	H	3-1	36,070	Anderton (pen), Sherwood, Carr

=== FA Cup ===
Round	Date	Opponent	Venue	Result	Attendance	Goalscorers
R3	12 December 1999	Newcastle United	H	1-1	33,116	Iversen
R3R	22 December 1999	Newcastle United	A	1-6	35,415	Ginola

=== League Cup ===
Round	Date	Opponent	Venue	Result	Attendance	Goalscorers
R3	13 October 1999	Crewe Alexandra	H	3-1	25,486	Leonhardsen, Ginola, Sherwood
R4	1 December 1999	Fulham	A	1-3	18,134	Iversen

=== UEFA Cup ===
Round	Date	Opponent	Venue	Result	Attendance	Goalscorers
R1 1st leg	16 September 1999	FC Zimbru Chişinău	H	3-0	32,660	Leonhardsen, Perry, Sherwood
R1 2nd leg	30 September 1999	FC Zimbru Chişinău	A	0-0 (won 3-0 on agg)	7,000	
R2 1st leg	28 October 1999	Kaiserslautern	H	1-0	35,486	Iversen (pen)
R2 2nd leg	4 November 1999	Kaiserslautern	A	0-2 (lost 1-2 on agg)	32,000	

== First-team squad ==
Squad at end of season

Note: Flags indicate national team as defined under FIFA eligibility rules; some limited exceptions apply. Players may hold more than one non-FIFA nationality.

No.	Pos.	Nation	Player
1	GK	ENG	Ian Walker
2	DF	IRL	Stephen Carr
3	DF	ARG	Mauricio Taricco
4	MF	GER	Steffen Freund
5	DF	ENG	Sol Campbell
6	DF	ENG	Chris Perry
7	MF	ENG	Darren Anderton
8	MF	ENG	Tim Sherwood
9	FW	ENG	Les Ferdinand
10	FW	NOR	Steffen Iversen
11	MF	NED	Willem Korsten
12	DF	IRL	Gary Doherty
14	MF	FRA	David Ginola

No.	Pos.	Nation	Player
15	DF	SUI	Ramon Vega
16	FW	ENG	Chris Armstrong
17	MF	NOR	Øyvind Leonhardsen
18	MF	ENG	Ruel Fox
19	DF	ENG	John Scales
20	FW	POR	José Dominguez
21	DF	ENG	Luke Young
22	MF	DEN	Allan Nielsen
23	FW	ENG	Dave McEwen
25	MF	ENG	Stephen Clemence
26	DF	ENG	Ledley King
28	MF	ENG	Matthew Etherington
29	MF	WAL	Simon Davies
32	FW	ENG	John Piercy

=== Left club during season ===
Note: Flags indicate national team as defined under FIFA eligibility rules; some limited exceptions apply. Players may hold more than one non-FIFA nationality.

No.	Pos.	Nation	Player
12	DF	ENG	Justin Edinburgh (to Portsmouth)
31	FW	NIR	Paul McVeigh (to Norwich City)
24	DF	ITA	Paolo Tramezzani (to Pistoiese)

No.	Pos.	Nation	Player
33	MF	ALG	Moussa Saïb (to Al Nassr)
34	DF	IRL	Simon Webb (to Leyton Orient)

=== Reserve squad ===
The following players did not appear for the first team this season.

Note: Flags indicate national team as defined under FIFA eligibility rules; some limited exceptions apply. Players may hold more than one non-FIFA nationality.

No.	Pos.	Nation	Player
13	GK	NOR	Espen Baardsen
27	MF	ENG	Mark Gower
30	DF	ENG	Anthony Gardner
35	DF	ENG	Alton Thelwell
36	FW	ENG	Peter Crouch
37	DF	ENG	Clayton Fortune
38	MF	ENG	Johnnie Jackson
39	DF	SWE	Jon Jönsson
40	GK	NED	Hans Segers
41	MF	ENG	David Lee
42	MF	ENG	Stuart Thurgood
43	MF	NIR	Ciarán Toner
44	FW	IRL	Neale Fenn
45	FW	FRA	Yannick Kamanan

No.	Pos.	Nation	Player
—	GK	ENG	Gavin Kelly
—	DF	ENG	Terry Adams
—	DF	ENG	Neil Lacy
—	MF	IRL	Andrew Burke

== Transfers ==
=== In ===
Date	Pos.	Name	From	Fee
3 July 1999	DF	(England) Chris Perry	(England) Wimbledon	£4,000,000
1 August 1999	FW	(France) Yannick Kamanan	(France) Le Mans Union Club 72	Free
6 August 1999	MF	(Norway) Øyvind Leonhardsen	(England) Liverpool	£3,000,000
31 December 1999	MF	(England) Matthew Etherington	(England) Peterborough United	£500,000
31 December 1999	MF	(Wales) Simon Davies	(England) Peterborough United	£700,000
17 January 2000	FW	(England) Dave McEwen	(England) Dulwich Hamlet	Free
24 January 2000	DF	(England) Anthony Gardner	(England) Port Vale	£1,000,000
25 January 2000	DF	(Sweden) Jon Jönsson	(Sweden) IFK Hässleholm	£250,000
27 March 2000	DF	(Republic of Ireland) Gary Doherty	(England) Luton Town	£1,000,000

=== Out ===
Date	Pos.	Name	To	Fee
30 June 1999	DF	(Norway) Roger Nilsen	(Austria) Grazer AK	Free
6 July 1999	MF	(England) Andy Sinton	(England) Wolverhampton Wanderers	Free
15 July 1999	FW	(England) Rory Allen	(England) Portsmouth	£1,000,000
20 July 1999	GK	(England) Simon Brown	(England) Colchester United	Free
28 July 1999	DF	(England) Clive Wilson	(England) Cambridge United	Free
5 August 1999	GK	(England) Alan Marriott	(England) Lincoln City	Free
8 October 1999	DF	(Republic of Ireland) Simon Webb	(England) Leyton Orient	Free
1 January 2000	MF	(Algeria) Moussa Saïb	(Saudi Arabia) Al Nassr	£640,000
4 February 2000	DF	(Italy) Paolo Tramezzani	(Italy) Pistoiese	Free
10 March 2000	DF	(England) Justin Edinburgh	(England) Portsmouth	£175,000
23 March 2000	FW	(Northern Ireland) Paul McVeigh	(England) Norwich City	Free

Transfers in: ▼£10,450,000
Transfers out: ▲£1,815,000
Total spending: ▼£8,635,000

== Statistics ==
=== Appearances and goals ===
Appearances as of end of season

No.	Pos	Nat	Player	Total		FA Premier League		FA Cup		League Cup		UEFA Cup	
No.	Pos	Nat	Player	Apps	Goals	Apps	Goals	Apps	Goals	Apps	Goals	Apps	Goals
Goalkeepers
1	GK	(England) ENG	Ian Walker	46	0	38	0	2	0	2	0	4	0
Defenders
2	DF	(Republic of Ireland) IRL	Stephen Carr	39	3	34	3	0	0	1	0	4	0
3	DF	(Argentina) ARG	Mauricio Taricco	35	0	29	0	1	0	2	0	3	0
5	DF	(England) ENG	Sol Campbell	35	0	29	0	2	0	2	0	2	0
6	DF	(England) ENG	Chris Perry	45	2	36+1	1	2	0	2	0	4	1
12	DF	(Republic of Ireland) IRL	Gary Doherty	2	0	0+2	0	0	0	0	0	0	0
15	DF	(Switzerland) SUI	Ramon Vega	8	1	2+3	1	1+1	0	0+1	0	0	0
17	DF	(England) ENG	John Scales	4	0	3+1	0	0	0	0	0	0	0
21	DF	(England) ENG	Luke Young	26	0	11+9	0	2	0	0+1	0	2+1	0
26	DF	(England) ENG	Ledley King	3	0	2+1	0	0	0	0	0	0	0
Midfielders
4	MF	(Germany) GER	Steffen Freund	34	0	24+3	0	1	0	2	0	4	0
7	MF	(England) ENG	Darren Anderton	22	3	22	3	0	0	0	0	0	0
8	MF	(England) ENG	Tim Sherwood	33	10	23+4	8	1	0	2	1	3	1
11	MF	(Netherlands) NED	Willem Korsten	9	0	4+5	0	0	0	0	0	0	0
14	MF	(France) FRA	David Ginola	43	6	36	4	2	1	2	1	2+1	0
17	MF	(Norway) NOR	Øyvind Leonhardsen	28	6	21+1	4	0	0	2	1	4	1
18	MF	(England) ENG	Ruel Fox	6	0	1+2	0	1+1	0	0	0	1	0
20	MF	(Portugal) POR	José Dominguez	17	0	2+10	0	1+1	0	0+1	0	0+2	0
22	MF	(Denmark) DEN	Allan Nielsen	17	0	5+9	0	2	0	0	0	1	0
25	MF	(England) ENG	Stephen Clemence	24	1	16+4	1	1	0	0	0	2+1	0
28	MF	(England) ENG	Matthew Etherington	5	0	1+4	0	0	0	0	0	0	0
29	MF	(Wales) WAL	Simon Davies	3	0	1+2	0	0	0	0	0	0	0
Forwards
9	FW	(England) ENG	Les Ferdinand	9	2	5+4	2	0	0	0	0	0	0
10	FW	(Norway) NOR	Steffen Iversen	44	17	36	14	2	1	1+1	1	4	1
16	FW	(England) ENG	Chris Armstrong	38	14	29+2	14	0+2	0	2	0	3	0
23	FW	(England) ENG	Dave McEwen	1	0	0+1	0	0	0	0	0	0	0
32	FW	(England) ENG	John Piercy	4	0	1+2	0	0	0	1	0	0	0
Players transferred out during the season
12	DF	(England) ENG	Justin Edinburgh	13	0	7+1	0	1	0	1	0	1+2	0

Last updated: 15 May 2000
Source: [[]]

=== Goal scorers ===
Last updated: 26 July 2020.
Source: premierleague.com

The list is sorted by shirt number when total goals are equal.

Rnk	Pos	No.	Player	FA Premier League	FA Cup	League Cup	UEFA Cup	Total
1	FW	10	(Norway) Steffen Iversen	14	1	1	1	17
2	FW	16	(England) Chris Armstrong	14	0	0	0	14
3	MF	8	(England) Tim Sherwood	8	0	1	1	10
4	MF	14	(France) David Ginola	4	1	1	0	6
4	MF	17	(Norway) Øyvind Leonhardsen	4	0	1	1	6
6	DF	2	(Republic of Ireland) Stephen Carr	3	0	0	0	3
6	MF	7	(England) Darren Anderton	3	0	0	0	3
8	DF	6	(England) Chris Perry	1	0	0	1	2
8	FW	9	(England) Les Ferdinand	2	0	0	0	2
10	DF	15	(Switzerland) Ramon Vega	1	0	0	0	1
10	MF	25	(England) Stephen Clemence	1	0	0	0	1
TOTALS				55	2	4	4	65

=== Clean sheets ===
Last updated: 26 July 2020.
Source: premierleague.com

Rnk	No.	Player	FA Premier League	FA Cup	League Cup	UEFA Cup	Total
1	1	(England) Ian Walker	9	0	0	3	12
TOTALS			9	0	0	3	12
