= 2000–01 Tottenham Hotspur F.C. season =

English football club season

Tottenham Hotspur
2000–01 season
- Chairman: Alan Sugar (until February); Daniel Levy (from February)
- Manager: George Graham (until 16 March); Glenn Hoddle (from 2 April)
- Stadium: White Hart Lane
- Premiership: 12th
- FA Cup: Semi-finals
- League Cup: Third round
- Top goalscorer: League: Les Ferdinand (10); All: Serhii Rebrov (12)
- Highest home attendance: 36,148 (vs. Ipswich Town, 19 August)
- Lowest home attendance: 26,909 (vs. Brentford, 27 September)
- Average home league attendance: 35,216
Home colours	Away colours

During the 2000–01 season, Tottenham Hotspur participated in the English Premier League, FA Cup, and Football League Cup.

== Season summary ==
Tottenham were thrown into turmoil on 16 March when it was announced that manager George Graham had been sacked for a breach of his contract. Countless names were linked with the vacancy and a popular decision was made two weeks later when it was announced that former player Glenn Hoddle would be returning to the club as manager. Despite the final documents completing the move not being agreed by Southampton on 30 March, a few days later the registration was released by the Saints which allowed Hoddle to officially take over the reins as Tottenham boss. A few weeks later, he re-signed Teddy Sheringham from Manchester United, as the first of many promised new signings, in a new-look side which many fans felt would be just the right set of players to bring the glory days back to White Hart Lane.

== Final league table ==
Pos	Team	Pld	W	D	L	GF	GA	GD	Pts	Qualification or relegation
10	Southampton	38	14	10	14	40	48	−8	52	
11	Newcastle United	38	14	9	15	44	50	−6	51	Qualification for the Intertoto Cup third round
12	Tottenham Hotspur	38	13	10	15	47	54	−7	49	
13	Leicester City	38	14	6	18	39	51	−12	48	
14	Middlesbrough	38	9	15	14	44	44	0	42	

Source: Premier League
Rules for classification: 1) points; 2) goal difference; 3) number of goals scored.

Results summary

Overall								Home						Away					
Pld	W	D	L	GF	GA	GD	Pts	W	D	L	GF	GA	GD	W	D	L	GF	GA	GD
38	13	10	15	47	54	−7	49	11	6	2	31	16	+15	2	4	13	16	38	−22

Source: 2000-01 FA Premier League table

Results by matchday

Match	1	2	3	4	5	6	7	8	9	10	11	12	13	14	15	16	17	18	19	20	21	22	23	24	25	26	27	28	29	30	31	32	33	34	35	36	37	38
Ground	H	A	A	H	H	A	H	A	A	H	A	H	A	H	H	A	A	H	H	A	A	H	A	H	A	H	A	H	A	H	A	H	A	H	A	H	A	H
Result	W	D	L	W	W	L	D	L	L	W	L	W	L	W	W	L	D	D	D	L	L	W	D	D	D	D	W	L	L	W	L	W	W	L	L	D	L	W
Position	4	2	10	2	5	5	6	10	11	8	12	9	10	9	7	9	9	11	11	11	13	12	10	10	11	11	11	12	12	11	12	12	9	10	11	11	12	12

Source: 11v11.com: 2000-01 Tottenham Hotspur results
A = Away; H = Home; W = Win; D = Draw; L = Loss

== Results ==
Tottenham Hotspur's score comes first

=== Legend ===
Win	Draw	Loss

=== FA Premier League ===
Date	Opponent	Venue	Result	Attendance	Scorers
19 August 2000	Ipswich Town	H	3-1	36,148	Anderton (pen), Carr, Ferdinand
22 August 2000	Middlesbrough	A	1-1	31,254	Leonhardsen
26 August 2000	Newcastle United	A	0-2	51,573	
5 September 2000	Everton	H	3-2	36,010	Rebrov (2, 1 pen), Ferdinand
11 September 2000	West Ham United	H	1-0	33,282	Campbell
16 September 2000	Charlton Athletic	A	0-1	20,043	
23 September 2000	Manchester City	H	0-0	36,069	
30 September 2000	Leeds United	A	3-4	37,562	Rebrov (2), Perry
14 October 2000	Coventry City	A	1-2	21,435	Rebrov
21 October 2000	Derby County	H	3-1	34,483	Leonhardsen (2), Carr
28 October 2000	Chelsea	A	0-3	34,966	
4 November 2000	Sunderland	H	2-1	36,016	Sherwood, Armstrong
11 November 2000	Aston Villa	A	0-2	33,608	
19 November 2000	Liverpool	H	2-1	36,036	Ferdinand, Sherwood
25 November 2000	Leicester City	H	3-0	35,636	Ferdinand (3)
2 December 2000	Manchester United	A	0-2	67,583	
9 December 2000	Bradford City	A	3-3	17,225	King, Campbell, Armstrong
18 December 2000	Arsenal	H	1-1	36,062	Rebrov
23 December 2000	Middlesbrough	H	0-0	35,638	
27 December 2000	Southampton	A	0-2	15,237	
30 December 2000	Ipswich Town	A	0-3	22,234	
2 January 2001	Newcastle United	H	4-2	34,324	Doherty, Anderton (pen), Rebrov, Ferdinand
13 January 2001	Everton	A	0-0	32,290	
20 January 2001	Southampton	H	0-0	36,095	
31 January 2001	West Ham United	A	0-0	26,048	
3 February 2001	Charlton Athletic	H	0-0	35,368	
10 February 2001	Manchester City	A	1-0	34,399	Rebrov
24 February 2001	Leeds United	H	1-2	36,070	Ferdinand
3 March 2001	Derby County	A	1-2	29,410	West (own goal)
17 March 2001	Coventry City	H	3-0	35,606	Iversen, Ferdinand, Rebrov
31 March 2001	Arsenal	A	0-2	38,121	
10 April 2001	Bradford City	H	2-1	28,306	Iversen, Davies
14 April 2001	Sunderland	A	3-2	48,029	Clemence, Doherty (2)
17 April 2001	Chelsea	H	0-3	36,074	
22 April 2001	Liverpool	A	1-3	43,547	Korsten
28 April 2001	Aston Villa	H	0-0	36,096	
5 May 2001	Leicester City	A	2-4	21,056	Davies, Carr
19 May 2001	Manchester United	H	3-1	36,072	Korsten (2), Ferdinand

=== FA Cup ===
Round	Date	Opponent	Venue	Result	Attendance	Goalscorers
R3	6 January 2001	Leyton Orient	A	1-0	12,336	Doherty
R4	7 February 2001	Charlton Athletic	A	4-2	18,101	Rufus (own goal), Anderton, Leonhardsen, Rebrov
R5	17 February 2001	Stockport County	H	4-0	36,040	King, Davies (2), Flynn (own goal)
QF	11 March 2001	West Ham United	A	3-2	26,048	Rebrov (2), Doherty
SF	8 April 2001	Arsenal	N	1-2	63,541	Doherty

=== League Cup ===
Round	Date	Opponent	Venue	Result	Attendance	Goalscorers
R2 1st Leg	19 September 2000	Brentford	A	0-0	8,580	
R2 2nd Leg	27 September 2000	Brentford	H	2-0 (won 2–0 on agg)	26,909	Leonhardsen, Iversen
R3	31 October 2000	Birmingham City	H	1-3	27,096	Anderton (pen)

== First-team squad ==
Squad at end of season

Note: Flags indicate national team as defined under FIFA eligibility rules; some limited exceptions apply. Players may hold more than one non-FIFA nationality.

No.	Pos.	Nation	Player
1	GK	ENG	Ian Walker
2	DF	IRL	Stephen Carr
3	DF	ARG	Mauricio Taricco
4	MF	GER	Steffen Freund
5	DF	ENG	Sol Campbell (captain)
6	DF	ENG	Chris Perry
7	MF	ENG	Darren Anderton
8	MF	ENG	Tim Sherwood
9	FW	ENG	Les Ferdinand
10	FW	NOR	Steffen Iversen
11	FW	UKR	Serhiy Rebrov
12	DF	IRL	Gary Doherty
13	GK	SCO	Neil Sullivan (Note: Sullivan was born in England.)

No.	Pos.	Nation	Player
15	MF	NED	Willem Korsten
16	FW	ENG	Chris Armstrong
17	MF	NOR	Øyvind Leonhardsen
18	DF	ENG	Ben Thatcher
21	DF	ENG	Luke Young
25	MF	ENG	Stephen Clemence
26	DF	ENG	Ledley King
27	FW	ENG	Dave McEwen
28	MF	ENG	Matthew Etherington
29	MF	WAL	Simon Davies
30	DF	ENG	Anthony Gardner
31	DF	ENG	Alton Thelwell
37	MF	ENG	John Piercy

=== Left club during season ===
Note: Flags indicate national team as defined under FIFA eligibility rules; some limited exceptions apply. Players may hold more than one non-FIFA nationality.

No.	Pos.	Nation	Player
19	FW	ENG	Andy Booth (on loan from Sheffield Wednesday)
31	MF	MSR	Ruel Fox (to West Bromwich Albion)
32	MF	POR	José Dominguez (to Kaiserslautern)

No.	Pos.	Nation	Player
33	MF	ENG	Mark Gower (to Barnet)
34	DF	SUI	Ramon Vega (on loan to Celtic)

=== Reserve squad ===
The following players did not appear for the first team this season.

Note: Flags indicate national team as defined under FIFA eligibility rules; some limited exceptions apply. Players may hold more than one non-FIFA nationality.

No.	Pos.	Nation	Player
24	GK	NED	Hans Segers
35	FW	IRL	Neale Fenn
36	DF	WAL	Ian Hillier
38	MF	ITA	Maurizio Consorti
39	GK	ENG	Gavin Kelly
40	MF	NIR	Ciarán Toner
41	MF	ENG	Johnnie Jackson
42	FW	FRA	Yannick Kamanan
43	GK	WAL	Jamie Attwell
45	FW	SCO	Steven Ferguson
—	DF	ENG	Terry Adams

No.	Pos.	Nation	Player
—	DF	ENG	Clayton Fortune
—	DF	SWE	Jon Jönsson
—	DF	IRL	Stephen Kelly
—	DF	ENG	Neil Lacy
—	MF	ENG	Ben Bowditch
—	MF	IRL	Andrew Burke
—	FW	ENG	Michael Malcolm
—	FW	ENG	John Sutton
—	FW	ITA	Luca Di Giuliantonio
—	FW	IRL	George Snee

== Statistics ==
=== Appearances ===
Last updated: 26 July 2020.
Source: premierleague.com

No.	Pos.	Name	Premier League		FA Cup		EFL Cup		Total	
No.	Pos.	Name	Apps	Goals	Apps	Goals	Apps	Goals	Apps	Goals
Goalkeepers
1	GK	(England) Ian Walker	3+1	0	0	0	0+1	0	3+2	0
13	GK	(Scotland) Neil Sullivan	35	0	5	0	3	0	43	0
Defenders
2	DF	(Republic of Ireland) Stephen Carr	27+1	3	1+1	0	3	0	31+2	3
3	DF	(Argentina) Mauricio Taricco	2+3	0	0	0	0	0	2+3	0
5	DF	(England) Sol Campbell	21	2	5	0	1	0	27	2
6	DF	(England) Chris Perry	30+2	1	4	0	3	0	37+2	1
12	DF	(Republic of Ireland) Gary Doherty	18+4	3	5	3	0	0	23+4	6
18	DF	(England) Ben Thatcher	10+2	0	0	0	3	0	13+2	0
21	DF	(England) Luke Young	19+4	0	4	0	0+1	0	23+5	0
26	DF	(England) Ledley King	18	1	4+1	1	0	0	22+1	2
30	DF	(England) Anthony Gardner	5+3	0	0	0	0	0	5+3	0
31	DF	(England) Alton Thelwell	13+3	0	0+2	0	0	0	13+5	0
Midfielders
4	MF	(Germany) Steffen Freund	19+2	0	3	0	3	0	25+2	0
7	MF	(England) Darren Anderton	22+1	2	2	1	1	1	25+1	4
8	MF	(England) Tim Sherwood	31+2	2	4	0	2	0	37+2	2
15	MF	(Netherlands) Willem Korsten	8+6	3	0+3	0	1	0	9+9	3
17	MF	(Norway) Øyvind Leonhardsen	23+2	3	3+1	1	2	1	28+3	5
25	MF	(England) Stephen Clemence	27+2	1	4	0	2	0	33+2	1
28	MF	(England) Matthew Etherington	1+5	0	0	0	1	0	2+5	0
29	MF	(Wales) Simon Davies	9+4	2	0+1	2	0+1	0	9+6	4
37	MF	(England) John Piercy	0+5	0	0	0	0	0	0+5	0
Forwards
9	FW	(England) Les Ferdinand	25+3	10	4	0	2+1	0	31+4	10
10	FW	(Norway) Steffen Iversen	10+4	2	2	0	2	1	14+4	3
11	FW	(Ukraine) Serhii Rebrov	28+1	9	5	3	2	0	35+1	12
16	FW	(England) Chris Armstrong	3+6	2	0	0	0	0	3+6	2
19	FW	(England) Andy Booth	3+1	0	0	0	0	0	3+1	0
27	FW	(England) Dave McEwen	0+3	0	0	0	0	0	0+3	0
Players transferred out during the season
32	MF	(Portugal) José Dominguez	0+2	0	0	0	0+2	0	0+4	0
34	MF	(Switzerland) Ramon Vega	8+2	0	0	0	2+1	0	10+3	0

=== Goal scorers ===
Last updated: 26 July 2020.
Source: premierleague.com

The list is sorted by shirt number when total goals are equal.

Rnk	Pos	No.	Player	Premier League	FA Cup	EFL Cup	Total
1	FW	11	(Ukraine) Serhii Rebrov	9	3	0	12
2	FW	9	(England) Les Ferdinand	10	0	0	10
3	DF	12	(Republic of Ireland) Gary Doherty	3	3	0	6
4	MF	17	(Norway) Øyvind Leonhardsen	3	1	1	5
5	MF	7	(England) Darren Anderton	2	1	1	4
5	MF	29	(Wales) Simon Davies	2	2	0	4
7	DF	2	(Republic of Ireland) Stephen Carr	3	0	0	3
7	FW	10	(Norway) Steffen Iversen	2	0	1	3
7	MF	15	(Netherlands) Willem Korsten	3	0	0	3
10	DF	5	(England) Sol Campbell	2	0	0	2
10	MF	8	(England) Tim Sherwood	2	0	0	2
10	FW	16	(England) Chris Armstrong	2	0	0	2
10	DF	26	(England) Ledley King	1	1	0	2
14	DF	6	(England) Chris Perry	1	0	0	1
14	MF	25	(England) Stephen Clemence	1	0	0	1
TOTALS				46	11	3	60

=== Clean sheets ===
Last updated: 26 July 2020.
Source: premierleague.com

The list is sorted by shirt number when total clean sheets are equal.

Rnk	No.	Player	Premier League	FA Cup	EFL Cup	Total
1	13	(Scotland) Neil Sullivan	9	2	2	13
2	1	(England) Ian Walker	2	0	1	3
TOTALS			11	2	3	16
