= 2002–03 Tottenham Hotspur F.C. season =

English football club season

Tottenham Hotspur
2002–03 season
- Owner: ENIC Group
- Chairman: Daniel Levy
- Manager: Glenn Hoddle
- Stadium: White Hart Lane
- Premier League: 10th
- FA Cup: Third round
- League Cup: Third round
- Top goalscorer: League: Robbie Keane (13); All: Robbie Keane; Teddy Sheringham (13)
Home colours	Away colours	Third colours

The 2002–03 season was Tottenham Hotspur's 11th season in the Premier League and 25th successive season in the top division of the English football league system. The club also participated in the FA Cup and the Football League Cup.

== Season summary ==
The 2002–03 campaign, manager Glenn Hoddle's second full season in charge of the team, was considered a major disappointment as the club finished in 10th place in the league table and exited both domestic cup competitions in the early rounds. Striker Robbie Keane, signed from Leeds United for £7,000,000 before the start of the season, was the team's top scorer in the Premier League with 13 goals, while club legend Teddy Sheringham, his final season with the club, scored a credible 13 goals in all competitions.

== Squad ==
Squad at end of season

Note: Flags indicate national team as defined under FIFA eligibility rules; some limited exceptions apply. Players may hold more than one non-FIFA nationality.

No.	Pos.	Nation	Player
1	GK	SCO	Neil Sullivan
2	DF	IRL	Stephen Carr
3	DF	ARG	Mauricio Taricco
4	MF	GER	Steffen Freund
5	DF	SCG	Goran Bunjevčević
6	DF	ENG	Chris Perry
7	MF	ENG	Darren Anderton
10	FW	ENG	Teddy Sheringham
11	FW	UKR	Serhiy Rebrov
12	DF	IRL	Gary Doherty
13	GK	USA	Kasey Keller
14	MF	URU	Gus Poyet
15	MF	ENG	Jamie Redknapp
16	FW	NOR	Steffen Iversen
17	MF	IRL	Mark Yeates
18	DF	WAL	Ben Thatcher
20	MF	BEL	Jonathan Blondel
21	MF	SLO	Milenko Ačimovič

No.	Pos.	Nation	Player
22	FW	IRL	Robbie Keane
23	MF	GER	Christian Ziege
24	GK	CAN	Lars Hirschfeld
25	FW	ENG	Jamie Slabber
26	DF	ENG	Ledley King
27	MF	ENG	Rohan Ricketts
28	MF	ENG	Matthew Etherington
29	MF	WAL	Simon Davies
30	DF	ENG	Anthony Gardner
31	DF	ENG	Alton Thelwell
32	MF	ENG	Johnnie Jackson
34	DF	IRL	Stephen Kelly
36	DF	ENG	Dean Richards
37	DF	ENG	Ronnie Henry
40	MF	ENG	Dean Marney
41	GK	ENG	Rob Burch
44	MF	JPN	Kazuyuki Toda (on loan from Shimizu S-Pulse)

== Transfers ==
=== Loans in ===
Date from	Position	Nationality	Name	From	Date until	Ref.
25 January 2003	MF	(Japan)	Kazuyuki Toda	(Japan) Shimizu S-Pulse	End of next season	

=== Transfers in ===
Date from	Position	Nationality	Name	From	Fee	Ref.
1 July 2002	MF	(England)	Jamie Redknapp	(England) Liverpool	Free	
1 July 2002	MF	(Slovenia)	Milenko Ačimovič	(Federal Republic of Yugoslavia) Red Star Belgrade	Free	
6 July 2002	MF	(Belgium)	Jonathan Blondel	(Belgium) Mouscron	£2,500,000	
13 July 2002	MF	(England)	Rohan Ricketts	(England) Arsenal	Free	
31 August 2002	FW	(Republic of Ireland)	Robbie Keane	(England) Leeds United	£7,000,000	

=== Transfers out ===
Date from	Position	Nationality	Name	From	Fee	Ref.
28 August 2002	FW	(England)	Chris Armstrong	(England) Bolton Wanderers	Free	
30 August 2002	MF	(Norway)	Oyvind Leonhardsen	(England) Aston Villa	Free	
20 September 2002	MF	(England)	John Piercy	(England) Brighton & Hove Albion	Free	
10 January 2003	MF	(England)	Stephen Clemence	(England) Birmingham City	£900,000	
21 January 2003	FW	(England)	Les Ferdinand	(England) West Ham United	Undisclosed	
11 February 2003	MF	(England)	Tim Sherwood	(England) Portsmouth	Free	
1 July 2003	FW	(France)	Yannick Kamanan	(France) Strasbourg	Free	

==== Expenditure ====
Summer: ▼£9,500,000

Winter: £0

Total: ▼£9,500,000

==== Income ====
Summer: £0

Winter: ▲£900,000

Total: ▲£900,000

==== Net totals ====
Summer: ▼£9,500,000

Winter: ▲£900,000

Total: ▼£8,600,000

=== Trialists ===
- (China) Qu Bo – unsuccessful

== Competitions ==
=== Overview ===
Competition	First match	Last match	Starting round	Final position	Record							
Competition	First match	Last match	Starting round	Final position	Pld	W	D	L	GF	GA	GD	Win %
Premier League	17 August 2002	11 May 2003	Matchday 1	10th	38	14	8	16	51	62	−11	36.84
FA Cup	4 January 2003	4 January 2003	Third round	Third round	1	0	0	1	0	4	−4	0.00
League Cup	1 October 2002	6 November 2002	Second round	Third round	2	1	0	1	2	2	+0	50.00
Total					41	15	8	18	53	68	−15	36.59

Source: Competitions

=== Premier League ===
==== League Table ====
Pos	Team	Pld	W	D	L	GF	GA	GD	Pts	Qualification or relegation
8	Southampton	38	13	13	12	43	46	−3	52	Qualification for the UEFA Cup first round (Note: Since Arsenal qualified for the Champions League, their place in the UEFA Cup as FA Cup winners went to Southampton, who were the FA Cup runners-up.)
9	Manchester City	38	15	6	17	47	54	−7	51	Qualification for the UEFA Cup qualifying round (Note: Manchester City qualified as the highest-ranked team not already qualified for European competitions of Premiership Fair Play League by The Football Association, the top association among UEFA Fair Play ranking winners.)
10	Tottenham Hotspur	38	14	8	16	51	62	−11	50	
11	Middlesbrough	38	13	10	15	48	44	+4	49	
12	Charlton Athletic	38	14	7	17	45	56	−11	49	

Source: Premier League
Rules for classification: 1) points; 2) goal difference; 3) number of goals scored.

==== Matches ====
17 August 2002 1	Everton	2–2	Tottenham Hotspur	Walton
15:00 BST	Pembridge 37'; Radzinski 81'	Report	Etherington 63'; Ferdinand 74'	Stadium: Goodison Park; Attendance: 40,120; Referee: Neale Barry

24 August 2002 2	Tottenham Hotspur	1–0	Aston Villa	Tottenham
15:00 BST	Redknapp 26'	Report		Stadium: White Hart Lane; Attendance: 35,384; Referee: Clive Wilkes

27 August 2002 3	Charlton Athletic	0–1	Tottenham Hotspur	Charlton
19:30 BST		Report	Davies 8'	Stadium: The Valley; Attendance: 26,461; Referee: Alan Wiley

31 August 2002 4	Tottenham Hotspur	2–1	Southampton	Tottenham
	Ferdinand 10'; Sheringham 90' (pen.)	Report	Taricco 28' (o.g.)	Stadium: White Hart Lane; Attendance: 35,573; Referee: Mike Dean

11 September 2002 5	Fulham	3–2	Tottenham Hotspur	Shepherd's Bush
	Inamoto 68'; Malbranque 84' (pen.); Legwinski 90'	Report	Richards 36'; Sheringham 44'	Stadium: Loftus Road; Attendance: 16,757; Referee: Mark Halsey

15 September 2002 6	Tottenham Hotspur	3–2	West Ham United	Tottenham
	Davies 62'; Sheringham 71'; Gardner 89'	Report	Kanouté 66'; Sinclair 77'	Stadium: White Hart Lane; Attendance: 36,005; Referee: Uriah Rennie

21 September 2002 7	Manchester United	1–0	Tottenham Hotspur	Trafford
	Van Nistlerooy 63' (pen.)	Report		Stadium: Old Trafford; Attendance: 67,611; Referee: Rob Styles

28 September 2002 8	Tottenham Hotspur	0–3	Middlesbrough	Tottenham
		Report	Maccarone 33'; Geremi 55'; Job 58'	Stadium: White Hart Lane; Attendance: 36,082; Referee: Graham Poll

6 October 2002 9	Blackburn Rovers	1–2	Tottenham Hotspur	Blackburn
	Østenstad 59'	Report	Keane 6'; Redknapp 89'	Stadium: Ewood Park; Attendance: 26,203; Referee: Andy D'Urso

20 October 2002 10	Tottenham Hotspur	3–1	Bolton Wanderers	Tottenham
	Keane 58', 73'; Davies 90'	Report	Djorkaeff 64'	Stadium: White Hart Lane; Attendance: 35,909; Referee: Paul Durkin

26 October 2002 11	Liverpool	2–1	Tottenham Hotspur	Liverpool
	Murphy 72'; Owen 86' (pen.)	Report	Richards 82'	Stadium: Anfield; Attendance: 44,084; Referee: Mike Riley

3 November 2002 12	Tottenham Hotspur	0–0	Chelsea	Tottenham
		Report		Stadium: White Hart Lane; Attendance: 36,049; Referee: Rob Styles

10 November 2002 13	Sunderland	2–0	Tottenham Hotspur	Sunderland
16:00 GMT	Phillips 60'; Flo 60'	Report		Stadium: Stadium of Light; Attendance: 40,024; Referee: Uriah Rennie

16 November 2002 14	Arsenal	3–0	Tottenham Hotspur	Holloway
	Henry 13'; Ljungberg 55'; Wiltord 71'	Report		Stadium: Highbury; Attendance: 38,152; Referee: Mike Riley

24 November 2002 15	Tottenham Hotspur	2–0	Leeds United	Tottenham
	Sheringham 12'; Keane 41'	Report		Stadium: White Hart Lane; Attendance: 35,718; Referee: Steve Bennett

30 November 2002 16	Birmingham City	1–1	Tottenham Hotspur	Birmingham
	Kenna 68'	Report	Sheringham 55'	Stadium: St Andrew's; Attendance: 29,505; Referee: Eddie Wolstenholme

8 December 2002 17	Tottenham Hotspur	3–1	West Bromwich Albion	Tottenham
	Ziege 3'; Keane 30'; Poyet 80'	Report	Dobie 73'	Stadium: White Hart Lane; Attendance: 35,958; Referee: Alan Wiley

15 December 2002 18	Tottenham Hotspur	1–1	Arsenal	Tottenham
	Ziege 11'	Report	Pires 45' (pen.)	Stadium: White Hart Lane; Attendance: 36,076; Referee: Neale Barry

23 December 2002 19	Manchester City	2–3	Tottenham Hotspur	Manchester
	Howey 29'; Benarbia 90'	Report	Perry 38'; Davies 48'; Poyet 83'	Stadium: Maine Road; Attendance: 34,563; Referee: Jeff Winter

26 December 2002 20	Tottenham Hotspur	2–2	Charlton Athletic	Tottenham
	Keane 68'; Iversen 87'	Report	Euell 14', 49'	Stadium: White Hart Lane; Attendance: 36,043; Referee: Andy D'Urso

29 December 2002 21	Newcastle United	2–1	Tottenham Hotspur	Newcastle
	Speed 17'; Shearer 58'	Report	Dabizas 73' (o.g.)	Stadium: St James' Park; Attendance: 52,145; Referee: Steve Bennett

1 January 2003 22	Southampton	1–0	Tottenham Hotspur	Southampton
	Beattie 82'	Report		Stadium: St Mary's Stadium; Attendance: 31,890; Referee: Mark Halsey

12 January 2003 23	Tottenham Hotspur	4–3	Everton	Tottenham
	Poyet 14'; Keane 50', 68', 83'	Report	McBride 10'; Watson 58'; Radzinski 74'	Stadium: White Hart Lane; Attendance: 36,070; Referee: Steve Dunn

18 January 2003 24	Aston Villa	0–1	Tottenham Hotspur	Birmingham
		Report	Sheringham 69'	Stadium: Villa Park; Attendance: 38,576; Referee: Neale Barry

29 January 2003 25	Tottenham Hotspur	0–1	Newcastle United	Tottenham
		Report	Jenas 90'	Stadium: White Hart Lane; Attendance: 36,084; Referee: David Elleray

1 February 2003 26	Chelsea	1–1	Tottenham Hotspur	Fulham
	Zola 40'	Report	Sheringham 18'	Stadium: Stamford Bridge; Attendance: 41,384; Referee: Paul Durkin

8 February 2003 27	Tottenham Hotspur	4–1	Sunderland	Tottenham
	Poyet 14'; Doherty 45'; Davies 67'; Sheringham 84'	Report	Phillips 26'	Stadium: White Hart Lane; Attendance: 36,075; Referee: Rob Styles

24 February 2003 28	Tottenham Hotspur	1–1	Fulham	Tottenham
	Sheringham 40' (pen.)	Report	King 15' (o.g.)	Stadium: White Hart Lane; Attendance: 34,704; Referee: Graham Barber

1 March 2003 29	West Ham United	2–0	Tottenham Hotspur	Upton Park
	L.Ferdinand 31'; Carrick 47'	Report		Stadium: Upton Park; Attendance: 35,049; Referee: Neale Barry

16 March 2003 30	Tottenham Hotspur	2–3	Liverpool	Tottenham
	Taricco 49'; Sheringham 87'	Report	Owen 51'; Heskey 72'; Gerrard 82'	Stadium: White Hart Lane; Attendance: 36,077; Referee: Uriah Rennie

24 March 2003 31	Bolton Wanderers	1–0	Tottenham Hotspur	Bolton
	Okocha 90' (pen.)	Report		Stadium: Reebok Stadium; Attendance: 23,084; Referee: Graham Poll

5 April 2003 32	Tottenham Hotspur	2–1	Birmingham City	Tottenham
	Keane 7'; Poyet 88'	Report	Devlin 77' (pen.)	Stadium: White Hart Lane; Attendance: 36,058; Referee: David Elleray

12 April 2003 33	Leeds United	2–2	Tottenham Hotspur	Leeds
	Viduka 31', 76' (pen.)	Report	Sheringham 37'; Keane 39'	Stadium: Elland Road; Attendance: 39,560; Referee: Rob Styles

18 April 2003 34	Tottenham Hotspur	0–2	Manchester City	Tottenham
		Report	Sommeil 2'; Barton 20'	Stadium: White Hart Lane; Attendance: 36,075; Referee: Mike Riley

21 April 2003 35	West Bromwich Albion	2–3	Tottenham Hotspur	West Bromwich
	Dichio 24'; Clement 61'	Report	Keane 45', 85'; Sheringham 63'	Stadium: The Hawthorns; Attendance: 26,899; Referee: Phil Dowd

27 April 2003 36	Tottenham Hotspur	0–2	Manchester United	Tottenham
		Report	Scholes 68' van Nistelrooy 90'	Stadium: White Hart Lane; Attendance: 36,073; Referee: Jeff Winter

3 May 2003 37	Middlesbrough	5–1	Tottenham Hotspur	Middlesbrough
	Christie 23'; Juninho 26'; Németh 26'; Maccarone 51', 75'	Report	Redknapp 60'	Stadium: Riverside Stadium; Attendance: 30,230; Referee: Uriah Rennie

11 May 2003 38	Tottenham Hotspur	0–4	Blackburn Rovers	Tottenham
		Report	Yorke 5'; Hignett 54'; Duff 48'; Cole 60'	Stadium: White Hart Lane; Attendance: 36,036; Referee: Andy D'Urso

=== FA Cup ===
4 January 2003 Third round	Southampton	4–0	Tottenham Hotspur	Southampton
	M.Svensson 13'; Tessem 50'; A.Svensson 56'; Beattie 80'	Report		Stadium: St Mary's Stadium; Attendance: 25,589; Referee: Mike Dean

=== League Cup ===
1 October 2002 Second round	Tottenham Hotspur	1–0	Cardiff City	Tottenham
	Sheringham 30'	Report		Stadium: White Hart Lane; Attendance: 23,723; Referee: Scott Mathieson

6 November 2002 Third round	Burnley	2–1	Tottenham Hotspur	Burnley
	Blake 57'; Davis 61'	Report	Poyet 17'	Stadium: Turf Moor; Attendance: 13,512; Referee: Dermot Gallagher

== Statistics ==
=== Appearances ===
Last updated: 26 July 2020.
Source: premierleague.com

No.	Pos.	Name	Premier League		FA Cup		League Cup		Total	
No.	Pos.	Name	Apps	Goals	Apps	Goals	Apps	Goals	Apps	Goals
Goalkeepers
13	GK	(United States) Kasey Keller	38	0	1	0	2	0	41	0
Defenders
2	DF	(Republic of Ireland) Stephen Carr	30	0	1	0	1	0	32	0
3	DF	(Argentina) Mauricio Taricco	21	1	1	0	1	0	23	1
5	DF	(Serbia and Montenegro) Goran Bunjevčević	31+4	0	0	0	2	0	33+4	0
6	DF	(England) Chris Perry	15+3	1	1	0	1	0	17+3	1
12	DF	(Republic of Ireland) Gary Doherty	7+8	1	0+1	0	0+2	0	7+11	1
18	DF	(England) Ben Thatcher	8+4	0	1	0	1	0	10+4	0
26	DF	(England) Ledley King	25	0	1	0	0	0	26	0
30	DF	(England) Anthony Gardner	11+1	1	0	0	1	0	12+1	1
36	DF	(England) Dean Richards	26	2	0	0	1	0	27	2
Midfielders
4	MF	(Germany) Steffen Freund	13+4	0	1	0	1	0	15+4	0
7	MF	(England) Darren Anderton	18+2	0	0+1	0	0+1	0	18+4	0
14	MF	(Uruguay) Gus Poyet	22+6	5	1	0	1	1	24+6	6
15	MF	(England) Jamie Redknapp	14+3	3	0	0	0	0	14+3	3
20	MF	(Belgium) Jonathan Blondel	0+1	0	0	0	0	0	0+1	0
21	MF	(Slovenia) Milenko Ačimovič	4+13	0	0	0	1	0	5+13	0
23	MF	(Germany) Christian Ziege	10+2	2	0	0	0	0	10+2	2
28	MF	(England) Matthew Etherington	15+8	1	0	0	2	0	17+8	1
29	MF	(Wales) Simon Davies	33+3	5	1	0	2	0	36+3	5
44	MF	(Japan) Kazuyuki Toda	2+2	0	0	0	0	0	2+2	0
Forwards
10	FW	(England) Teddy Sheringham	34+2	12	1	0	1	1	36+2	13
16	FW	(Norway) Steffen Iversen	8+11	1	0+1	0	1+1	0	9+13	1
22	FW	(Republic of Ireland) Robbie Keane	29	13	1	0	1+1	0	31+1	13
25	FW	(England) Jamie Slabber	0+1	0	0	0	0	0	0+1	0
Players transferred out during the season
9	MF	(England) Les Ferdinand	4+7	2	0	0	1+1	0	5+8	2
25	MF	(England) Stephen Clemence	0	0	0	0	1	0	1	0

=== Goal scorers ===
Last updated: 26 July 2020.
Source: premierleague.com

The list is sorted by shirt number when total goals are equal.

Rnk	Pos	No.	Player	Premier League	FA Cup	League Cup	Total
1	FW	10	(England) Teddy Sheringham	12	0	1	13
1	FW	22	(Republic of Ireland) Robbie Keane	13	0	0	13
3	MF	14	(Uruguay) Gus Poyet	5	0	1	6
4	MF	29	(Wales) Simon Davies	5	0	0	5
5	MF	15	(England) Jamie Redknapp	3	0	0	3
6	FW	9	(England) Les Ferdinand	2	0	0	2
6	MF	23	(Germany) Christian Ziege	2	0	0	2
6	DF	36	(England) Dean Richards	2	0	0	2
9	DF	3	(Argentina) Mauricio Taricco	1	0	0	1
9	DF	6	(England) Chris Perry	1	0	0	1
9	DF	12	(Republic of Ireland) Gary Doherty	1	0	0	1
9	FW	16	(Norway) Steffen Iversen	1	0	0	1
9	MF	28	(England) Matthew Etherington	1	0	0	1
9	DF	30	(England) Anthony Gardner	1	0	0	1
Total					0	2	52

=== Clean sheets ===
Last updated: 26 July 2020.
Source: premierleague.com

Rnk	No.	Player	Premier League	FA Cup	League Cup	Total
1	13	(United States) Kasey Keller	5	0	1	6
Total			5	0	1	6
