= 2003–04 Tottenham Hotspur F.C. season =

English football club season

Tottenham Hotspur F.C.
2003–04 season
- Chairman: Daniel Levy
- Manager: Glenn Hoddle (until 21 September); David Pleat (from 21 September)
- Premier League: 14th
- FA Cup: Fourth round
- League Cup: Fifth round
- Top goalscorer: League: Robbie Keane (14); All: Robbie Keane (16)
| Home colours | Away colours | Third colours |

The 2003–04 season was Tottenham Hotspur's 12th season in the Premier League and 26th successive season in the top division of the English football league system. The club also participated in the FA Cup and the Football League Cup.

== Season summary ==
A dismal start to the season cost Glenn Hoddle his job and he was sacked as manager on 21 September after two-and-a-half years at the helm. Director of Football David Pleat took over first team duties until the end of the season, but was unable to inspire Tottenham to a challenge for European qualification, nor either of the cup competitions, and a 14th-place finish in the final table was Tottenham's lowest since 1998.

== Squad ==
Note: Flags indicate national team as defined under FIFA eligibility rules; some limited exceptions apply. Players may hold more than one non-FIFA nationality.

| No. | Pos. | Nation | Player |
|---|---|---|---|
| 2 | DF | IRL | Stephen Carr |
| 3 | DF | ARG | Mauricio Taricco |
| 5 | DF | SCG | Goran Bunjevčević |
| 6 | MF | ENG | Michael Brown |
| 7 | MF | ENG | Darren Anderton |
| 8 | FW | POR | Hélder Postiga |
| 9 | FW | MLI | Frédéric Kanouté |
| 10 | FW | IRL | Robbie Keane |
| 12 | DF | IRL | Gary Doherty |
| 13 | GK | USA | Kasey Keller |
| 14 | MF | URU | Gustavo Poyet |
| 15 | MF | ENG | Jamie Redknapp |
| 18 | FW | ENG | Jermain Defoe |
| 21 | DF | RSA | Mbulelo Mabizela |

| No. | Pos. | Nation | Player |
|---|---|---|---|
| 22 | FW | ENG | Lee Barnard |
| 23 | MF | GER | Christian Ziege |
| 24 | GK | ENG | Rob Burch |
| 26 | DF | ENG | Ledley King (captain) |
| 27 | MF | ENG | Rohan Ricketts |
| 28 | MF | IRL | Mark Yeates |
| 29 | MF | WAL | Simon Davies |
| 30 | DF | ENG | Anthony Gardner |
| 31 | MF | ENG | Dean Marney |
| 32 | MF | ENG | Johnnie Jackson |
| 33 | GK | CAN | Lars Hirschfeld |
| 34 | DF | IRL | Stephen Kelly |
| 35 | FW | ENG | Jamie Slabber |
| 36 | DF | ENG | Dean Richards |

Last updated: 14 October 2019.
Source: footballsquads.co.uk

== Transfers ==
=== Transfers in ===
| Date from | Position | Nationality | Name | From | Fee | Ref. |
|---|---|---|---|---|---|---|
| 25 June 2003 | ST | (Portugal) | Hélder Postiga | (Portugal) Porto | £6,250,000 | |
| 18 July 2003 | ST | (England) | Bobby Zamora | (England) Brighton and Hove Albion | £1,500,000 | |
| 8 August 2003 | DF | (South Africa) | Mbulelo Mabizela | (South Africa) Orlando Pirates | Undisclosed | |
| 4 August 2003 | ST | (France) | Frédéric Kanouté | (England) West Ham United | £3,500,000 | |
| 2 January 2004 | MF | (England) | Michael Brown | (England) Sheffield United | £500,000 | |
| 4 February 2004 | ST | (England) | Jermain Defoe | (England) West Ham United | £7,000,000 | |

=== Transfers out ===
| Date from | Position | Nationality | Name | From | Fee | Ref. |
|---|---|---|---|---|---|---|
| 13 June 2003 | DF | (England) | Alton Thelwell | (England) Hull City | Free | |
| 30 June 2003 | ST | (England) | Teddy Sheringham | (England) Portsmouth | Free | |
| 17 July 2003 | DF | (Wales) | Ben Thatcher | (England) Leicester City | £300,000 | |
| 1 August 2003 | ST | (Norway) | Steffen Iversen | (England) Wolverhampton Wanderers | Free | |
| 4 August 2003 | MF | (England) | Matthew Etherington | (England) West Ham United | £1,000,000; Part Exchange | |
| 29 August 2003 | GK | (Scotland) | Neil Sullivan | (England) Chelsea | Free | |
| 28 November 2003 | DF | (England) | Chris Perry | (England) Charlton Athletic | £100,000 | |
| 28 January 2004 | MF | (Belgium) | Jonathan Blondel | (Belgium) Club Brugge | Undisclosed | |
| 4 February 2004 | ST | (England) | Bobby Zamora | (England) West Ham United | Part Exchange | |

=== Loans in ===
| Date from | Position | Nationality | Name | From | End | Ref. |
|---|---|---|---|---|---|---|
| 1 September 2003 | DF | (England) | Paul Konchesky | (England) Charlton Athletic | January 2004 | |
| 1 September 2003 | MF | (France) | Stéphane Dalmat | (Italy) Internazionale | Season | |

=== Loan out ===
| Date from | Position | Nationality | Name | From | End | Ref. |
|---|---|---|---|---|---|---|
| 28 January 2004 | MF | (Slovenia) | Milenko Ačimovič | (France) Lille | five-month loan | |

=== Released ===
| Date from | Position | Nationality | Name | To | Fee | Ref. |
|---|---|---|---|---|---|---|
| 1 August 2003 | MF | (Germany) | Steffen Freund | (Germany) Kaiserslautern | Released | |
| 28 November 2003 | DF | (England) | Ronnie Henry | Free Agent | Released | |
| 28 November 2003 | MF | (England) | Jonathan Black | | Released | |
| 27 July 2004 | ST | (Ukraine) | Serhii Rebrov | (England) West Ham United | Released | |

=== Overall transfer activity ===
==== Expenditure ====
Summer: ▼£11,250,000

Winter: ▼£7,500,000

Total: ▼£18,750,000

==== Income ====
Summer: ▲£1,300,000

Winter: ▲£100,000

Total: ▲£1,400,000

==== Net totals ====
Summer: ▼£9,950,000

Winter: ▼£7,400,000

Total: ▼£17,350,000

== Competitions overview ==
| Competition | Record | | | | | | |
| Competition | P | W | D | L | GF | GA | Win % |
|---|---|---|---|---|---|---|---|
| Premier League | 38 | 13 | 6 | 19 | 47 | 57 | 34.21 |
| FA Cup | 3 | 1 | 1 | 1 | 7 | 5 | 33.33 |
| League Cup | 4 | 3 | 1 | 0 | 8 | 2 | 75.00 |
| Total | 45 | 17 | 8 | 20 | 62 | 64 | 37.78 |

=== Premier League ===
==== League table ====
| Pos | Team | Pld | W | D | L | GF | GA | GD | Pts |
|---|---|---|---|---|---|---|---|---|---|
| 12 | Southampton | 38 | 12 | 11 | 15 | 44 | 45 | −1 | 47 |
| 13 | Portsmouth | 38 | 12 | 9 | 17 | 47 | 54 | −7 | 45 |
| 14 | Tottenham Hotspur | 38 | 13 | 6 | 19 | 47 | 57 | −10 | 45 |
| 15 | Blackburn Rovers | 38 | 12 | 8 | 18 | 51 | 59 | −8 | 44 |
| 16 | Manchester City | 38 | 9 | 14 | 15 | 55 | 54 | +1 | 41 |

Source: Premier League
Rules for classification: 1) points; 2) goal difference; 3) number of goals scored.

==== Results per matchday ====
| Matchday | 1 | 2 | 3 | 4 | 5 | 6 | 7 | 8 | 9 | 10 | 11 | 12 | 13 | 14 | 15 | 16 | 17 | 18 | 19 | 20 | 21 | 22 | 23 | 24 | 25 | 26 | 27 | 28 | 29 | 30 | 31 | 32 | 33 | 34 | 35 | 36 | 37 | 38 |
|---|---|---|---|---|---|---|---|---|---|---|---|---|---|---|---|---|---|---|---|---|---|---|---|---|---|---|---|---|---|---|---|---|---|---|---|---|---|---|
| Ground | A | H | A | H | A | H | A | H | A | H | H | A | H | A | H | A | H | A | H | H | A | H | A | H | A | H | A | H | A | A | H | A | H | A | H | A | H | A |
| Result | L | W | D | L | L | L | D | W | W | D | L | L | W | L | W | L | L | L | L | W | W | W | L | W | W | D | L | W | L | L | L | L | D | L | D | L | W | W |
| Position | 18 | 10 | 10 | 14 | 16 | 17 | 17 | 13 | 11 | 12 | 12 | 13 | 12 | 15 | 11 | 13 | 15 | 17 | 18 | 16 | 13 | 12 | 13 | 12 | 11 | 10 | 10 | 10 | 11 | 12 | 12 | 13 | 13 | 14 | 16 | 16 | 15 | 14 |

A = Away; H = Home; W = Win; D = Draw; L = Loss

==== Results ====
Manager: Glenn Hoddle

| 16 August 2003 1 | Birmingham City | 1–0 | Tottenham Hotspur | Birmingham |
| | Dunn 36' (pen.) | Report | | Stadium: St Andrew's; Attendance: 29,398; Referee: Rob Styles |

| 23 August 2003 2 | Tottenham Hotspur | 2–1 | Leeds United | Haringey, London |
| | Taricco 41'; Kanouté 71' | Report | Alan Smith 5' | Stadium: White Hart Lane; Attendance: 34,354; Referee: Steve Dunn |

| 27 August 2003 3 | Liverpool | 0–0 | Tottenham Hotspur | Liverpool |
| | | Report | | Stadium: Anfield; Attendance: 43,778; Referee: Uriah Rennie |

| 30 August 2003 4 | Tottenham Hotspur | 0–3 | Fulham | Haringey, London |
| | | Report | Hayles 23', 67'; Boa Morte 71' | Stadium: White Hart Lane; Attendance: 33,421; Referee: Jeff Winter |

| 13 September 2003 5 | Chelsea | 4–2 | Tottenham Hotspur | London |
| | Lampard 35'; Mutu 37', 75'; Hasselbaink 90' | Report | Kanouté 25', 87' | Stadium: Stamford Bridge; Attendance: 41,165; Referee: Graham Poll |

| 20 September 2003 6 | Tottenham Hotspur | 1–3 | Southampton | Haringey, London |
| | Kanouté 62' | Report | Beattie 2', 43'; Phillips 60' | Stadium: White Hart Lane; Attendance: 35,784; Referee: Andy D'Urso |

Caretaker Manager: David Pleat

| 28 September 2003 7 | Manchester City | 0–0 | Tottenham Hotspur | Manchester, Greater Manchester |
| | | Report | | Stadium: City of Manchester Stadium; Attendance: 46,842; Referee: Neale Barry |

| 4 October 2003 8 | Tottenham Hotspur | 3–0 | Everton | Haringey, London |
| | Kanouté 71'; Poyet 46'; Keane 46' | Report | | Stadium: White Hart Lane; Attendance: 36,137; Referee: Dermot Gallagher |

| 19 October 2003 9 | Leicester City | 1–2 | Tottenham Hotspur | Leicester |
| | Dickov 38' | Report | Mabizela 79'; Kanouté 90' | Stadium: Walkers Stadium; Attendance: 31,521; Referee: Andy D'Urso |

| 26 October 2003 10 | Tottenham Hotspur | 0–0 | Middlesbrough | Haringey, London |
| | | Report | | Stadium: White Hart Lane; Attendance: 32,643; Referee: Mike Dean |

| 1 November 2003 11 | Tottenham Hotspur | 0–1 | Bolton Wanderers | Haringey, London |
| | | Report | Nolan 73' | Stadium: White Hart Lane; Attendance: 35,191; Referee: Uriah Rennie |

| 8 November 2003 12 | Arsenal | 2–1 | Tottenham Hotspur | London |
| | Pires 69'; Ljungberg 79' | Report | Anderton 5' | Stadium: Highbury; Attendance: 38,101; Referee: Mark Halsey |

| 23 November 2003 13 | Tottenham Hotspur | 2–1 | Aston Villa | Haringey, London |
| | Ricketts 78'; Keane 81' | Report | Allbäck 66' | Stadium: White Hart Lane; Attendance: 33,140; Referee: Jeff Winter |

| 29 November 2003 14 | Blackburn Rovers | 1–0 | Tottenham Hotspur | Blackburn |
| | Greško 78' | Report | | Stadium: Ewood Park; Attendance: 22,802; Referee: Graham Poll |

| 6 December 2003 15 | Tottenham Hotspur | 5–2 | Wolverhampton Wanderers | Haringey, London |
| | Keane 29', 75', 83'; Kanouté 50'; Dalmat 90' | Report | Ince 30'; Rae 84' | Stadium: White Hart Lane; Attendance: 34,825; Referee: Uriah Rennie |

| 13 December 2003 16 | Newcastle United | 4–0 | Tottenham Hotspur | Newcastle |
| | Robert 35', 55'; Shearer 59', 66' | Report | | Stadium: St James' Park; Attendance: 52,139; Referee: Alan Wiley |

| 21 December 2003 17 | Tottenham Hotspur | 1–2 | Manchester United | Haringey, London |
| | Poyet 63' | Report | O'Shea 15' van Nistelrooy 25' | Stadium: White Hart Lane; Attendance: 35,910; Referee: Rob Styles |

| 26 December 2003 18 | Portsmouth | 2–0 | Tottenham Hotspur | Portsmouth |
| | Berger 52', 68' | Report | | Stadium: Fratton Park; Attendance: 20,078; Referee: Steve Dunn |

| 28 December 2003 19 | Tottenham Hotspur | 0–1 | Charlton Athletic | Haringey, London |
| | | Report | Cole 69' | Stadium: White Hart Lane; Attendance: 34,534; Referee: Paul Durkin |

| 7 January 2004 20 | Tottenham Hotspur | 4–1 | Birmingham City | Haringey, London |
| | Dalmat 10', 24'; Davies 39'; Keane 79' | Report | Savage 68' (pen.) | Stadium: White Hart Lane; Attendance: 30,016; Referee: Barry Knight |

| 10 January 2004 21 | Leeds United | 0–1 | Tottenham Hotspur | Leeds |
| | | Report | Keane 56' | Stadium: Elland Road; Attendance: 35,365; Referee: Mark Halsey |

| 17 January 2004 22 | Tottenham Hotspur | 2–1 | Liverpool | Haringey, London |
| | Keane 25' (pen.); Postiga 54' | Report | Kewell 75' | Stadium: White Hart Lane; Attendance: 36,104; Referee: Uriah Rennie |

| 31 January 2004 23 | Fulham | 2–1 | Tottenham Hotspur | London |
| | Malbranque 45' (pen.); McBride 67' | Report | Keane 18' (pen.) | Stadium: Craven Cottage; Attendance: 17,024; Referee: Matt Messias |

| 7 February 2004 24 | Tottenham Hotspur | 4–3 | Portsmouth | Haringey, London |
| | Defoe 13'; Keane 41', 78'; Poyet 89' | Report | Berkovic 39'; LuaLua 73'; Mornar 84' | Stadium: White Hart Lane; Attendance: 36,107; Referee: Peter Walton |

| 11 February 2004 25 | Charlton Athletic | 2–4 | Tottenham Hotspur | London |
| | Stuart 51'; Perry 81' | Report | Davies 10'; Defoe 43'; King 46'; Jackson 85' | Stadium: The Valley; Attendance: 26,660; Referee: Graham Barber |

| 22 February 2004 26 | Tottenham Hotspur | 4–4 | Leicester City | Haringey, London |
| | Brown 6'; Defoe 13', 89'; Keane 28' | Report | Doherty 9' (o.g.); Ferdinand 51'; Thatcher 74'; Bent 79' | Stadium: White Hart Lane; Attendance: 35,218; Referee: Neale Barry |

| 9 March 2004 27 | Middlesbrough | 1–0 | Tottenham Hotspur | Middlesbrough |
| | Németh 73' | Report | | Stadium: Riverside Stadium; Attendance: 31,789; Referee: Mark Halsey |

| 14 March 2004 28 | Tottenham Hotspur | 1–0 | Newcastle United | Haringey, London |
| | O'Brien 86' (o.g.) | Report | | Stadium: White Hart Lane; Attendance: 36,083; Referee: Howard Webb |

| 20 March 2004 29 | Manchester United | 3–0 | Tottenham Hotspur | Manchester |
| | Giggs 30'; Cristiano Ronaldo 89'; Bellion 90' | Report | | Stadium: Old Trafford; Attendance: 67,634; Referee: Dermt Gallagher |

| 27 March 2004 30 | Southampton | 1–0 | Tottenham Hotspur | Southampton |
| | Delap 64' | Report | | Stadium: St Mary's Stadium; Attendance: 31,973; Referee: Chris Foy |

| 3 April 2004 31 | Tottenham Hotspur | 0–1 | Chelsea | Haringey, London |
| | | Report | Hasselbaink 38' | Stadium: White Hart Lane; Attendance: 36,101; Referee: Steve Bennett |

| 9 April 2004 32 | Everton | 3–1 | Tottenham Hotspur | Merseyside |
| | Unsworth 17'; Naysmith 24'; Yobo 40' | Report | Carr 75' | Stadium: Goodison Park; Attendance: 38,086; Referee: Rob Styles |

| 12 April 2004 33 | Tottenham Hotspur | 1–1 | Manchester City | Haringey, London |
| | Defoe 52' | Report | Anelka 25' | Stadium: White Hart Lane; Attendance: 35,282; Referee: Chris Foy |

| 17 April 2004 34 | Bolton | 2–0 | Tottenham Hotspur | Bolton |
| | Campo 7'; Pedersen 65' | Report | | Stadium: Reebok Stadium; Attendance: 26,440; Referee: Jeff Winter |

| 25 April 2004 35 | Tottenham Hotspur | 2–2 | Arsenal | Haringey, London |
| | Redknapp 62'; Keane 90' (pen.) | Report | Vieira 3'; Pires 35' | Stadium: White Hart Lane; Attendance: 36,097; Referee: Mark Halsey |

| 2 May 2004 36 | Aston Villa | 1–0 | Tottenham Hotspur | Birmingham |
| | Ángel 5' | Report | | Stadium: Villa Park; Attendance: 42,573; Referee: Neale Barry |

| 8 May 2004 37 | Tottenham Hotspur | 1–0 | Blackburn Rovers | Haringey, London |
| | Defoe 18' | Report | | Stadium: White Hart Lane; Attendance: 35,698; Referee: Andy D'Urso |

| 15 May 2004 38 | Wolverhampton Wanderers | 0–2 | Tottenham Hotspur | Wolverhampton |
| | | Report | Keane 34'; Defoe 57' | Stadium: Molineux; Attendance: 29,389; Referee: Steve Bennett |

=== FA Cup ===
| 3 January 2004 3rd round | Tottenham Hotspur | 3–0 | Crystal Palace | Haringey, London |
| | Kanouté 15', 20', 48' | Report | | Stadium: White Hart Lane; Attendance: 32,340; Referee: Andy D'Urso |

| 25 January 2004 4th round | Manchester City | 1–1 | Tottenham Hotspur | Greater Manchester |
| | Anelka 10' | Report | Doherty 57' | Stadium: City of Manchester Stadium; Attendance: 34,000; Referee: Steve Dunn |

| 4 February 2004 4th round (Replay) | Tottenham Hotspur | 3–4 | Manchester City | Haringey, London |
| | King 2'; Keane 19'; Ziege 43' | Report | Distin 48'; Bosvelt 61'; Wright-Phillips 80'; Macken 90' | Stadium: White Hart Lane; Attendance: 30,400; Referee: Rob Styles |

=== League Cup ===
| 24 September 2003 2nd round | Coventry City | 0–3 | Tottenham Hotspur | Coventry |
| | | Report | Kanouté 13'; Keane 23'; Ricketts 78' | Stadium: Highfield Road; Attendance: 15,474; Referee: Mike Jones |

| 29 October 2004 3rd round | Tottenham Hotspur | 1–0 (a.e.t.) | West Ham United | Haringey, London |
| | Zamora 92' | Report | | Stadium: White Hart Lane; Attendance: 36, 053; Referee: Graham Barber |

| 3 December 2004 4th round | Tottenham Hotspur | 3–1 | Manchester City | Haringey, London |
| | Anderton 9'; Postiga 29'; Kanouté 90' | Report | Fowler 80' | Stadium: White Hart Lane; Attendance: 31,727; Referee: Paul Durkin |

| 17 December 2003 5th round | Tottenham Hotspur | 1–1 (a.e.t.) (4–5 p) | Middlesbrough | Haringey, London |
| | Anderton 2' | Report | Ricketts 86' | Stadium: White Hart Lane; Attendance: 25,307; Referee: Mike Dean |
| | Penalties |
| | Keane (penalty scored); Carr (penalty scored); Konchesky (penalty scored); Poyet (penalty missed); Kanouté (penalty scored); Taricco (penalty missed) | | Ricketts (penalty scored); Juninho (penalty scored); Zenden (penalty scored); Mills (penalty scored); Mendieta (penalty missed); Queudrue (penalty scored) |

== Statistics ==
=== Appearances and goals ===
Last updated: 26 July 2020.
Source: premierleague.com

| No. | Pos | Nat | Player | Total | | Premier League | | FA Cup | | League Cup | |
| No. | Pos | Nat | Player | Apps | Goals | Apps | Goals | Apps | Goals | Apps | Goals |
Goalkeepers
| 13 | GK | (United States) USA | Kasey Keller | 45 | 0 | 38 | 0 | 3 | 0 | 4 | 0 |
Defenders
| 2 | DF | (Republic of Ireland) IRL | Stephen Carr | 39 | 1 | 32 | 1 | 3 | 0 | 4 | 0 |
| 3 | DF | (Argentina) ARG | Mauricio Taricco | 37 | 1 | 31+1 | 1 | 2 | 0 | 3 | 0 |
| 5 | DF | (Serbia and Montenegro) SCG | Goran Bunjevčević | 8 | 0 | 3+4 | 0 | 0 | 0 | 1 | 0 |
| 12 | DF | (Republic of Ireland) IRL | Gary Doherty | 22 | 1 | 16+1 | 0 | 2 | 1 | 2+1 | 0 |
| 21 | DF | (South Africa) RSA | Mbulelo Mabizela | 7 | 1 | 0+6 | 1 | 0 | 0 | 0+1 | 0 |
| 30 | DF | (England) ENG | Anthony Gardner | 40 | 0 | 33 | 0 | 3 | 0 | 4 | 0 |
| 34 | DF | (Republic of Ireland) IRL | Stephen Kelly | 11 | 0 | 7+4 | 0 | 0 | 0 | 0 | 0 |
| 36 | DF | (England) ENG | Dean Richards | 26 | 0 | 23 | 0 | 1 | 0 | 2 | 0 |
Midfielders
| 6 | MF | (England) ENG | Michael Brown | 19 | 1 | 17 | 1 | 2 | 0 | 0 | 0 |
| 7 | MF | (England) ENG | Darren Anderton | 24 | 3 | 16+4 | 1 | 1 | 0 | 3 | 2 |
| 14 | MF | (Uruguay) URU | Gus Poyet | 25 | 3 | 12+8 | 3 | 1+1 | 0 | 2+1 | 0 |
| 15 | MF | (England) ENG | Jamie Redknapp | 17 | 1 | 14+3 | 1 | 0 | 0 | 0 | 0 |
| 23 | MF | (Germany) GER | Christian Ziege | 10 | 1 | 7+1 | 0 | 1 | 1 | 1 | 0 |
| 26 | MF | (England) ENG | Ledley King | 35 | 2 | 28+1 | 1 | 3 | 1 | 3 | 0 |
| 27 | MF | (England) ENG | Rohan Ricketts | 28 | 2 | 12+12 | 1 | 0 | 0 | 3+1 | 1 |
| 28 | MF | (Republic of Ireland) IRL | Mark Yeates | 1 | 0 | 1 | 0 | 0 | 0 | 0 | 0 |
| 29 | MF | (Wales) WAL | Simon Davies | 20 | 2 | 17 | 2 | 2+1 | 0 | 0 | 0 |
| 31 | MF | (England) ENG | Dean Marney | 3 | 0 | 1+2 | 0 | 0 | 0 | 0 | 0 |
| 32 | MF | (England) ENG | Johnnie Jackson | 14 | 1 | 9+2 | 1 | 1+2 | 0 | 0 | 0 |
Forwards
| 8 | FW | (Portugal) POR | Hélder Postiga | 24 | 2 | 9+10 | 1 | 2 | 0 | 1+2 | 1 |
| 9 | FW | (Mali) MLI | Frédéric Kanouté | 31 | 12 | 19+8 | 7 | 1 | 3 | 2+1 | 2 |
| 10 | FW | (Republic of Ireland) IRL | Robbie Keane | 41 | 16 | 31+3 | 14 | 3 | 1 | 4 | 1 |
| 18 | FW | (England) ENG | Jermain Defoe | 15 | 7 | 14+1 | 7 | 0 | 0 | 0 | 0 |
Players transferred out during the season
| 11 | MF | (France) FRA | Stéphane Dalmat | 28 | 3 | 12+10 | 3 | 2+1 | 0 | 1+2 | 0 |
| 16 | DF | (England) ENG | Paul Konchesky | 15 | 0 | 10+2 | 0 | 0 | 0 | 2+1 | 0 |
| 20 | MF | (Belgium) BEL | Jonathan Blondel | 3 | 0 | 0+1 | 0 | 0 | 0 | 1+1 | 0 |
| 25 | FW | (England) ENG | Bobby Zamora | 18 | 1 | 6+10 | 0 | 0+1 | 0 | 1 | 1 |

Last updated: 30 May 2004
Source: soccerbase.com

=== Goal scorers ===
Last updated: 26 July 2020.
Source: premierleague.com

The list is sorted by shirt number when total goals are equal.

| Rnk | Pos | No. | Player | Premier League | FA Cup | League Cup | Total |
|---|---|---|---|---|---|---|---|
| 1 | FW | 10 | (Republic of Ireland) Robbie Keane | 14 | 1 | 1 | 16 |
| 2 | FW | 9 | (Mali) Frédéric Kanouté | 7 | 3 | 2 | 12 |
| 3 | FW | 18 | (England) Jermain Defoe | 7 | 0 | 0 | 7 |
| 4 | MF | 7 | (England) Darren Anderton | 1 | 0 | 2 | 3 |
| 4 | MF | 11 | (France) Stéphane Dalmat | 3 | 0 | 0 | 3 |
| 4 | MF | 14 | (Uruguay) Gus Poyet | 3 | 0 | 0 | 3 |
| 7 | FW | 8 | (Portugal) Hélder Postiga | 1 | 0 | 1 | 2 |
| 7 | DF | 26 | (England) Ledley King | 1 | 1 | 0 | 2 |
| 7 | MF | 27 | (England) Rohan Ricketts | 1 | 0 | 1 | 2 |
| 7 | MF | 29 | (Wales) Simon Davies | 2 | 0 | 0 | 2 |
| 11 | DF | 2 | (Republic of Ireland) Stephen Carr | 1 | 0 | 0 | 1 |
| 11 | DF | 3 | (Argentina) Mauricio Taricco | 1 | 0 | 0 | 1 |
| 11 | MF | 6 | (England) Michael Brown | 1 | 0 | 0 | 1 |
| 11 | DF | 12 | (Republic of Ireland) Gary Doherty | 0 | 1 | 0 | 1 |
| 11 | MF | 15 | (England) Jamie Redknapp | 1 | 0 | 0 | 1 |
| 11 | DF | 21 | (South Africa) Mbulelo Mabizela | 1 | 0 | 0 | 1 |
| 11 | MF | 23 | (Germany) Christian Ziege | 0 | 1 | 0 | 1 |
| 11 | FW | 25 | (England) Bobby Zamora | 0 | 0 | 1 | 1 |
| 11 | MF | 32 | (England) Johnnie Jackson | 1 | 0 | 0 | 1 |
| TOTALS | | | | 46 | 7 | 8 | 61 |

=== Clean sheets ===
Last updated: 26 July 2020.
Source: premierleague.com

| Rnk | No. | Player | Premier League | FA Cup | League Cup | Total |
|---|---|---|---|---|---|---|
| 1 | 13 | (United States) Kasey Keller | 8 | 1 | 2 | 11 |
| TOTALS | | | 8 | 1 | 2 | 11 |
