= Anthony Gardner (footballer) =

English footballer

Personal information
- Full name: Anthony Derek Gardner
- Date of birth: 19 September 1980 (age 46)
- Place of birth: Stafford, England
- Height: 6 ft 5 in (1.96 m)
- Position: Centre back

Youth career
- 1997–1998: Port Vale

Senior career*
Years	Team	Apps	(Gls)
1998–2000	Port Vale	41	(4)
2000–2008	Tottenham Hotspur	114	(2)
2008	→ Everton (loan)	0	(0)
2008	→ Hull City (loan)	0	(0)
2008–2011	Hull City	32	(0)
2010–2011	→ Crystal Palace (loan)	28	(1)
2011–2012	Crystal Palace	28	(0)
2012–2014	Sheffield Wednesday	42	(0)
Total		285	(7)

International career
2001	England U21	1	(0)
2004	England	1	(0)
- * Club domestic league appearances and goals

Anthony Derek Gardner (born 19 September 1980) is an English former professional footballer who played as a centre back. He played once for the England national team and was bought and sold for millions of pounds in the domestic transfer market.

Starting his career with Port Vale in 1998, within two years, he earned an £855,000 move to Tottenham Hotspur. He spent eight years at the Premier League club, making 142 appearances in all competitions. In 2008 he spent time on loan at both Everton and Hull City, before signing permanently with the latter that summer for £2.5 million. He spent the 2010–11 season on loan at Crystal Palace before joining the club permanently the next season. He signed with Sheffield Wednesday in June 2012 and stayed with the club for two years.

== Club career ==
=== Port Vale ===
Born and raised in Stafford, Gardner played football for the local junior club Stafford Falcons. He was initially a forward before being moved into defence. He began his career with First Division club Port Vale after signing associate schoolboy forms in 1994. He signed his first professional contract on 31 July 1998. He made his first-team debut under John Rudge on 31 October, in a 3–2 defeat to Sheffield United at Vale Park. He scored his first senior goal on 1 May 1999, in a 2–0 win over Queens Park Rangers. He won the club's young Player of the Year award for the 1998–99 season and making 15 league appearances.

He made 29 appearances in the 1999–2000 season under new manager Brian Horton, scoring goals at Queens Park Rangers, Huddersfield Town and Sheffield United.

=== Tottenham Hotspur ===
Gardner signed for George Graham's Tottenham Hotspur in January 2000 for a fee of £855,000 rising to £1.2m. He had been scouted by director of football David Pleat. Gardner worked his way up through the reserve team before making his debut as a substitute against Derby County in March 2001. He finished 2000–01 with eight appearances. However, he suffered knee ligament damage in the season finale v Manchester United, which ruled him out until December. He played 19 matches in the 2001–02 campaign.

Gardner scored the winner and his first goal for Tottenham in a thriller 3–2 victory over local rivals West Ham United in September 2002. However, he was limited to just 13 appearances in 2002–03. He managed to play 40 matches in 2003–04, with 33 of these matches being in the Premier League. However, he lost his first-team place after Jacques Santini replaced Glenn Hoddle as manager Gardner scored his second Tottenham goal in a League Cup tie against Oldham Athletic on 22 September 2004. However, he made just 17 league appearances in 2004–05. Injury restricted him to just 17 league matches again in 2005–06, and made just 16 appearances in 2006–07, of which eight were in the league.

At the beginning of 2007–08, Gardner found himself on the teamsheet due to the ongoing injuries of Ledley King and Michael Dawson. He managed to make an impact – in vain – by scoring his team's only goal in their second Premier League match of the season at home to Everton on 15 August 2007, which Tottenham lost 3–1. On 25 October, he was injured playing against Getafe in the UEFA Cup. He was stretchered off with a suspected broken ankle in the 42nd minute. On 31 January 2008, Gardner signed for Tottenham's Premier League rivals Everton on loan for the remainder of the season, but did not make a single appearance. David Moyes had signed him to provide cover for the defensive backline after Alan Stubbs had departed, though the defence remained injury free and Gardner was not required to take to the field. Throughout the season, he played just six competitive matches for Tottenham as manager Juande Ramos had significantly bolstered the Spurs defence.

=== Hull City ===
Gardner was loaned to Premier League newcomers Hull City at the start of 2008–09. The initial deal was to last until January 2009, but Hull had the option of purchasing him at any point during the loan period. Hull exercised their purchase option to make the loan move permanent in August for a £2.5 million fee, which at the time was a club record signing. On 23 March 2009, it was revealed that Gardner missed the remainder of the season after x-rays revealed four fractured vertebrae in the base of his spine. The injury was sustained in the 2–1 defeat to Arsenal in the FA Cup at the Emirates Stadium six days earlier. Hull avoided relegation, however, Gardner only played eight matches in 2008–09.

Gardner was made captain and played 24 matches in 2009–10, as Hull suffered relegation into the Championship after finishing in 19th place. He made a further three appearances in 2010–11, before leaving the club before the end of the summer transfer window.

=== Crystal Palace ===
On 31 August 2010, he joined Crystal Palace on a five-month loan deal, which was later extended to the end of the season. He scored his first goal for Palace in a 2–1 win at Norwich City on 19 October. Gardner made 28 Championship appearances for Palace over the course of the season, forming a solid partnership with Paddy McCarthy. At the end of the season, Gardner was not offered a new contract by Hull. This allowed him to sign for Palace on a one-year contract on 19 August 2011.

Gardner was then an important part of Crystal Palace's solid defensive record in the 2011–12 campaign and credited manager Dougie Freedman for instilling a good team spirit in the squad. He played all 120 minutes of Palace's "stunning extra time victory at Old Trafford" on 30 November 2011, as they defeated Premier League champions Manchester United 2–1 to reach the semi-final of the League Cup. He scored with his head for the home team at both Selhurst Park and the Cardiff City Stadium in the semi-final, leaving the tie level at 1–1 after two legs; Cardiff City won the subsequent penalty shoot-out to deny Palace a place at the final. He was ruled out for the rest of the campaign after sustaining ankle and hamstring problems at the end of March. Gardner was short-listed for the club's Player of the Year award at the end of the season, though the award instead went to fellow defender Jonathan Parr. Palace offered him a new contract, but it quickly became apparent that Gardner would instead be moving to a new club.

=== Sheffield Wednesday ===
He signed a two-year contract with Championship newcomers Sheffield Wednesday on 20 June 2012; manager Dave Jones said that he "is a quality player and a leader, with Championship and Premiership pedigree". He was made captain for his Wednesday debut on 13 August, in a 4–2 League Cup win over Oldham Athletic. He made 38 appearances in 2012–13, and was twice named on the Championship Team of the Week and shortlisted for the clubs player of the season.

Gardner played six matches before being ruled out for 2013–14 after requiring surgery on an Achilles rupture injury in September. He was released by new manager Stuart Gray in May 2014 and subsequently retired in from professional football in 2015.

== International career ==
A squad member of the 2000 under-21 European Championships he represented England at under-21 level, gaining one cap under David Platt in March 2002.

Gardner began to impress during 2003–04. He earned his England first call-up as cover for Gareth Southgate in a friendly against Denmark in March 2004. He won his first and only England cap against Sweden on 31 March 2004, after Sven-Göran Eriksson used him as a half-time substitute for Jonathan Woodgate.

== Personal life ==
His cousin, Jordan Fincher, took part in Sky1's Football's Next Star in 2010. He became an avid poker player after retiring from football.

== Career statistics ==
=== Club ===
Appearances and goals by club, season and competition
Club	Season	League			FA Cup		League Cup		Europe		Total	
Club	Season	Division	Apps	Goals	Apps	Goals	Apps	Goals	Apps	Goals	Apps	Goals
Port Vale	1998–99	First Division	15	1	0	0	0	0	—		15	1
Port Vale	1999–2000	First Division	26	3	1	0	2	0	—		29	3
Port Vale	Total		41	4	1	0	2	0	—		44	4
Tottenham Hotspur	1999–2000	Premier League	0	0	—		—		—		0	0
Tottenham Hotspur	2000–01	Premier League	8	0	0	0	0	0	—		8	0
Tottenham Hotspur	2001–02	Premier League	15	0	1	0	3	0	—		19	0
Tottenham Hotspur	2002–03	Premier League	12	1	0	0	1	0	—		13	1
Tottenham Hotspur	2003–04	Premier League	33	0	3	0	4	0	—		40	0
Tottenham Hotspur	2004–05	Premier League	17	0	5	0	2	1	—		24	1
Tottenham Hotspur	2005–06	Premier League	17	0	1	0	0	0	—		18	0
Tottenham Hotspur	2006–07	Premier League	8	0	4	0	3	0	1 (Note: Appearance(s) in UEFA Cup)	0	16	0
Tottenham Hotspur	2007–08	Premier League	4	1	0	0	0	0	2	0	6	1
Tottenham Hotspur	Total		114	2	14	0	13	1	3	0	144	3
Everton (loan)	2007–08	Premier League	0	0	—		—		—		0	0
Hull City	2008–09	Premier League	6	0	2	0	0	0	—		8	0
Hull City	2009–10	Premier League	24	0	0	0	0	0	—		24	0
Hull City	2010–11	Championship	2	0	—		1	0	—		3	0
Hull City	Total		32	0	2	0	1	0	—		35	0
Crystal Palace (loan)	2010–11	Championship	28	1	1	0	—		—		29	1
Crystal Palace	2011–12	Championship	28	0	0	0	5	1	—		33	1
Crystal Palace	Total		56	1	1	0	5	1	—		62	2
Sheffield Wednesday	2012–13	Championship	37	0	0	0	1	0	—		38	0
Sheffield Wednesday	2013–14	Championship	5	0	0	0	1	0	—		6	0
Sheffield Wednesday	Total		42	0	0	0	2	0	—		44	0
Career total			285	7	18	0	23	2	3	0	329	9

=== International ===
Appearances and goals by national team and year
National team	Year	Apps	Goals
England	2004	1	0
Total		1	0

== Honours ==
Tottenham Hotspur

- Football League Cup runner-up: 2001–02
