= Simon Davies (footballer, born 1979) =

Welsh footballer (born 1979)

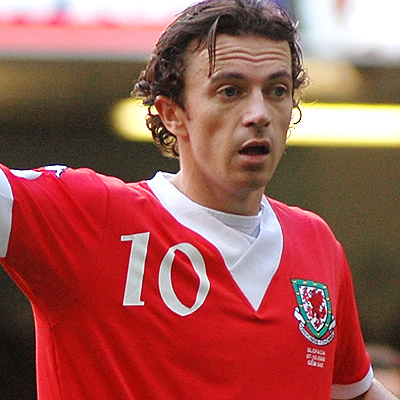
- Davies playing for Wales in 2006

Personal information
- Date of birth: 23 October 1979 (age 47)
- Place of birth: Haverfordwest, Wales
- Height: 1.78 m (5 ft 10 in)
- Position: Winger

Youth career
- Solva
- Norwich City
- Peterborough United

Senior career*
Years	Team	Apps	(Gls)
1997–2000	Peterborough United	65	(6)
2000–2005	Tottenham Hotspur	121	(13)
2005–2007	Everton	45	(1)
2007–2013	Fulham	137	(13)
Total		368	(33)

International career
1998–2001	Wales U21	10	(0)
	Wales B	1	(0)
2001–2010	Wales	58	(6)
- * Club domestic league appearances and goals

Simon Davies (born 23 October 1979) is a Welsh former professional footballer who played as a winger. Davies started his career at Peterborough United before playing for Premier League clubs Tottenham Hotspur, Everton and Fulham, earning a runner-up medal during the 2009–10 UEFA Europa League with Fulham. Davies made more than 350 appearances at senior club level in England, along with earning 58 caps for the Welsh national team. He was most recently the assistant manager of Crawley Town.

== Club career ==
=== Peterborough United ===
Davies played as a junior for Solva AFC, before becoming a trainee at Norwich City and then moving to Peterborough United at the age of 15. After graduating from the side's academy system, he quickly established himself as a first team player with the club, amassing over 50 first team appearances before he turned 20.

At the end of the 98/99 season he was named in the Division Three team of year, and as Peterborough's player of the year.

After a trial with Manchester United in July 1999, Davies' performances for Peterborough encouraged Tottenham Hotspur manager George Graham to spend £700,000 to take him, along with fellow winger Matthew Etherington, to White Hart Lane on 31 December 1999.

=== Tottenham Hotspur ===
Davies made his Spurs debut on 9 April 2000 during a 2–0 defeat against Liverpool.

Davies spent the early months of the 2000–01 season as a substitute. However, after coming on for the injured Øyvind Leonhardsen early in the FA Cup fifth round tie against Stockport County on 17 February 2001, Davies scored twice. This game marked the beginning of his transformation into a first-team regular for the club.

In the five years that Davies played for Tottenham, during which time he suffered a number of injuries, he made 154 appearances and scored 24 goals in all competitions.

=== Everton ===
On 26 May 2005, he completed a transfer to Everton for a fee which could have reached £4 million depending on appearances. The move meant that Davies received his first chance to play in Europe's premier football competition, the UEFA Champions League. On the whole, Davies had a poor first season in Everton's disappointing 2005–06 campaign. He did, however, score a winning goal at Birmingham City to give Everton their first win in over two months, a result which prompted a change in fortunes for the Merseysiders.

=== Fulham ===
In January 2007, he left Everton for Fulham, for an undisclosed fee. He was brought in as the long-term replacement for Steed Malbranque on the right side of midfield. On 30 January 2007, he played his first Premier League match for Fulham against Sheffield United.

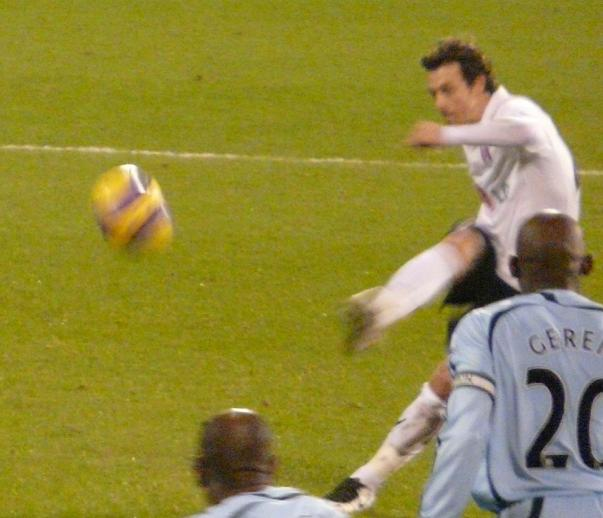
Davies taking a free kick for Fulham

Since joining Fulham from Everton, he became a mainstay on the right hand side of midfield contributing with some spectacular goals (free kick against Sunderland and full volley against Reading) and great crosses. His pace, along with his high work rate made him a crowd favourite and earned him the respect of then-manager Lawrie Sanchez. Davies was voted Fulham's player of the season in 2007–08.

Davies scored a dramatic equaliser in the second leg of Fulham's UEFA Europa League semi-final against Hamburg on 29 April 2010; Fulham went on to win the game and the tie 2–1. He followed that up with a volleyed goal in the first half of the final against Atlético Madrid in Hamburg that made the score 1–1, although Fulham went on to lose 2–1 in extra time.

Davies signed a new deal with Fulham on 16 August 2010 that saw him playing for the club until 2013. However, Davies later career at Fulham faded after suffering injuries. This first occurred when he suffered a knee injury, which lead Davies sidelined for five months following surgery. Four months later, on 10 December 2011, Davies made his first start of the 2011/12 season, in a 2–0 loss against Swansea City. Davies went on to make six appearances before suffering a hip injury. Davies was told by Manager Martin Jol will only be a bit-part player to make way for youngsters ahead of the 2012–13 season.

Despite being included in the club's Premier League squad, Davies played his first match in the club's reserve match in a 2–2 against Wycombe Wanderers reserve team. Davies was one of 12 players released by Fulham at the end of the 2012–13 Premier League season.

=== Solva ===
In July 2013, he returned to his boyhood club, Solva AFC, and played 40 minutes in a game against St Ishmaels at Maes-y-Mor. He formally signed for the amateur Pembrokeshire League Division Two club in September 2014, paying £3 per game 'subs' for the privilege.

== International career ==
Davies made his debut for Wales in a World Cup qualifier against Ukraine on 6 June 2001, and scored his first goal against Croatia on 21 August 2002. Arguably, his best performance for his country came on 16 October 2002 when he scored the team's opening goal in a 2–1 victory over Italy.

Davies played for Wales 58 times and scored six goals, captaining his country during their 2010 World Cup qualifiers and he was Welsh Footballer Of The Year in 2002.

He announced his retirement from international football on 9 August 2010.

== Coaching career ==
On 27 November 2022, Davies was appointed assistant to Matthew Etherington at EFL League Two club Crawley Town. Having overseen just three matches however, the duo departed the club on 29 December 2022 with the club's CEO saying that the partnership was no longer the right fit to carry the club forward.

== Career statistics ==
=== Club ===
Appearances and goals by club, season and competition
Club	Season	League			FA Cup		League Cup		FA Trophy		Europe		Total	
Club	Season	Division	Apps	Goals	Apps	Goals	Apps	Goals	Apps	Goals	Apps	Goals	Apps	Goals
Peterborough United	1997–98	Third Division	6	0	0	0	0	0	1	0	—		7	0
Peterborough United	1998–99	Third Division	43	4	1	0	2	0	2	0	—		48	4
Peterborough United	1999–2000	Third Division	16	2	2	0	2	0	0	0	—		20	2
Peterborough United	Total		65	6	3	0	4	0	3	0	0	0	75	6
Tottenham Hotspur	1999–2000	Premier League	3	0	0	0	0	0	—		0	0	3	0
Tottenham Hotspur	2000–01	Premier League	13	2	1	2	1	0	—		—		15	4
Tottenham Hotspur	2001–02	Premier League	31	4	3	0	7	3	—		—		41	7
Tottenham Hotspur	2002–03	Premier League	36	5	1	0	2	0	—		—		39	5
Tottenham Hotspur	2003–04	Premier League	17	2	3	0	0	0	—		—		20	2
Tottenham Hotspur	2004–05	Premier League	21	0	5	0	3	0	—		—		29	0
Tottenham Hotspur	Total		121	13	13	2	13	3	0	0	0	0	147	18
Everton	2005–06	Premier League	30	1	2	0	1	0	—		3 (Note: Two appearances in the Champions League and one in the UEFA Cup)	0	36	1
Everton	2006–07	Premier League	15	0	0	0	2	0	—		—		17	0
Everton	Total		45	1	2	0	3	0	0	0	3	0	53	1
Fulham	2006–07	Premier League	14	2	2	0	0	0	—		—		16	2
Fulham	2007–08	Premier League	37	5	1	0	2	0	—		—		40	5
Fulham	2008–09	Premier League	33	2	5	1	1	0	—		—		39	3
Fulham	2009–10	Premier League	17	0	4	1	1	0	—		11 (Note: Appearances in the Europa League)	2	33	3
Fulham	2010–11	Premier League	30	4	2	0	1	0	—		—		31	4
Fulham	2011–12	Premier League	6	0	0	0	0	0	—		1	0	7	0
Fulham	2012–13	Premier League	0	0	0	0	0	0	—		—		0	0
Fulham	Total		137	13	14	2	5	0	0	0	12	2	167	17
Career total			361	32	32	4	25	3	3	0	15	2	436	41

== Honours ==
Tottenham Hotspur

- Football League Cup runner-up: 2001–02

Fulham

- UEFA Europa League runner-up: 2009–10

Individual

- Welsh Footballer of the Year: 2002, 2008
- PFA Team of the Year: 1998–99 Third Division
