= Dave McEwen =

English footballer

Personal information
- Full name: David McEwen
- Date of birth: 2 November 1977 (age 48)
- Place of birth: Hackney, England
- Position: Forward

Youth career
- Arsenal

Senior career*
Years	Team	Apps	(Gls)
- Crouch End Vampires
- Crawley Town
1999–2000	Dulwich Hamlet		
2000–2001	Tottenham Hotspur	4	(0)
2001–2002	Queens Park Rangers	5	(0)
- Hertford Town
Total		9	(0)
- * Club domestic league appearances and goals

Dave McEwen is an English former professional footballer who played for Tottenham Hotspur and Queens Park Rangers in the English Premier League.

== Career ==
Signed from Dulwich Hamlet in March 2000, he initially shone in the Spurs reserves before appearing as an unused substitute against Wimbledon on 22 April. He then replaced Steffen Iversen for the final 20 minutes against Derby County in the following match. In January 2001 he made his final three substitute appearances against Everton, Southampton and West Ham United, replacing Willem Korsten, Les Ferdinand and Serhii Rebrov respectively.

His period at Spurs was unsuccessful, and he was eventually replaced as a preferred reserve forward by Andy Booth. He left for Queens Park Rangers in August 2001.
