= Willem Korsten =

Dutch footballer

Personal information
- Full name: Willem Korsten
- Date of birth: 21 January 1975 (age 51)
- Place of birth: Boxtel, Netherlands
- Position: Left winger

Team information
- Current team: Achilles '29

Youth career
- N.E.C.

Senior career*
Years	Team	Apps	(Gls)
1992–1993	N.E.C.	4	(0)
1993–1999	Vitesse Arnhem	75	(12)
1999	→ Leeds United (loan)	7	(2)
1999–2001	Tottenham Hotspur	23	(3)
2002	SCV'58	5	(0)
2011	Achilles '29	1	(0)
Total		115	(17)
- * Club domestic league appearances and goals as of 11:11, 30 June 2011 (CET)

Willem Korsten (born 21 January 1975 in Boxtel) is a former Dutch professional footballer who played as a left winger.

== Football career ==
Korsten played in the Netherlands for N.E.C. and SBV Vitesse before earning a loan move to Leeds United in the Premier League. In this short amount of time Korsten showed he had the pace, skill and strength to cope with English football, scoring twice in games against Everton and Derby County. Leeds decided to pursue a permanent transfer. However, Tottenham Hotspur also made a bid in the region of £1.5 million for the player, which was accepted.

Due to injury, Korsten did not make his debut for Tottenham until December 1999 and made only nine appearances in the Premier League in the 1999–2000 season.

The following season he made 14 league appearances, scoring his first Tottenham goal in a 3–1 defeat against Liverpool at Anfield in April 2001. On the final day of the season, he scored two spectacular goals in a 3–1 win over champions Manchester United at White Hart Lane. The match proved to be his last as a professional footballer. In October 2001, due to persistent hip injuries, he was forced to retire at the age of 26.

Korsten returned to his former club, N.E.C., as a coach for its football academy. He played 5 games for Dutch lower amateur side SCV '58 from Velp in their 2002–03 campaign but injuries forced him to quit the team early in the season.

In May 2011 Korsten returned to the game as player for Topklasse side Achilles '29. After winning the district cup east, Korsten scored the only goal in the final of the KNVB Amateur Cup 2011 on 18 June. He retired once again and joined the Achilles staff for the 2011/12 campaign as their assistant-manager. Korsten resigned at Achilles in March 2012 and joined N.E.C. as an assistant-manager for the 2012–13 season.
