= Steffen Iversen =

Norwegian footballer and manager (born 1976)

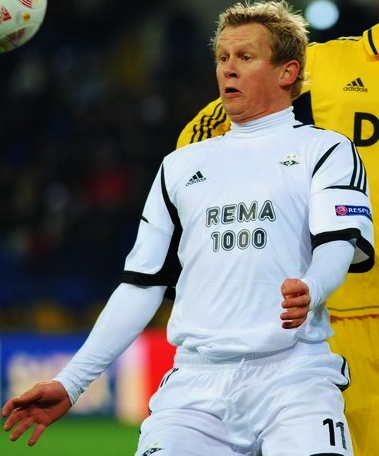
- Iversen playing for Rosenborg in 2012

Personal information
- Full name: Steffen Iversen
- Date of birth: 10 November 1976 (age 49)
- Place of birth: Oslo, Norway
- Height: 1.85 m (6 ft 1 in)
- Position: Striker

Youth career
- Nationalkameratene
- –1994: Astor FK
- 1994–1995: Rosenborg

Senior career*
Years	Team	Apps	(Gls)
1995–1996	Rosenborg	50	(18)
1996–2003	Tottenham Hotspur	144	(36)
2003–2004	Wolverhampton Wanderers	16	(4)
2004–2005	Vålerenga	32	(11)
2006–2010	Rosenborg	128	(63)
2011–2012	Crystal Palace	20	(2)
2012	Rosenborg	21	(6)
2013–2014	Herd	2	(0)
2016–2017	Haugar	14	(11)
2018–2019	Trygg/Lade	20	(7)
Total		447	(158)

International career
1994	Norway U17	7	(4)
1995	Norway U18	4	(4)
1995–1998	Norway U21	19	(14)
1998	Norway U23	3	(3)
1998–2011	Norway	79	(21)

Managerial career
- 2018–2019: Trygg/Lade (player-manager)
- * Club domestic league appearances and goals

Steffen Iversen (born 10 November 1976) is a Norwegian former footballer who last worked as player-manager for Norwegian 4th division side Trygg/Lade as a striker. He is the son of former Norway international Odd Iversen, one of Norway's most prolific goalscorers of all time.

Iversen began his career as an 18-year-old at Rosenborg where he won two consecutive Norwegian league championships. He moved to Tottenham Hotspur in December 1996, where he scored 54 goals in seven years, and won the League Cup. After a brief spell at Wolverhampton Wanderers, he moved back to his native Norway where he spent two years at Vålerenga and was a contributing factor to Vålerenga's first league championship in 21 years. In 2006, he moved back to Rosenborg, where he won his second consecutive league title, and after another league victory in 2010, Iversen spent 13 months at Crystal Palace, before he signed for Rosenborg for the third time in February 2012.

Iversen was capped 79 times for the national team, scoring 21 goals. He scored Norway's only goal in a UEFA European Football Championship when he scored the match-winning goal against Spain in the group stage of UEFA Euro 2000.

== Club career ==
=== Early career ===
Steffen Iversen was born in Oslo, when his father, Odd Iversen, was playing for Vålerenga. His family moved back to Trondheim when he was three years old, and the first club that Iversen played for was his father's club Rosenborg. He signed for Nationalkameratene at the age of seven, and the contract, dated 16 February 1984, included a clause that stated that Steffen Iversen any time could move back to Rosenborg free of charge, and was signed by his father. He later moved on to Astor before he joined Rosenborg's youth department in 1994, where he scored six goals in his debut for the reserve team.

He joined Rosenborg's first team squad in 1995, and made his debut in the first match of the season against Kongsvinger at Lerkendal on 21 April 1995. During the two season he first played at Rosenborg, he scored 18 goals in 50 matches, won two consecutive league championship and played in the Champions League. His last match in his first period for Rosenborg was the famous win against Milan at San Siro.

=== Tottenham Hotspur and Wolverhampton Wanderers ===
In December 1996, he joined Tottenham Hotspur for a fee of £2.3 million, and made his Premier League debut against Coventry City, four days after his last match for Rosenborg. A highlight in his first season at Tottenham was scoring a hat-trick in a 4-0 win at Sunderland. He spent seven years at White Hart Lane – collecting a League Cup winners' medal in 1999, assisting Allan Nielsen's stoppage time winner. He also scored the winning goal in the semi-final against Wimbledon. He became the top scorer for the club in the 1998–99 and 1999–2000 season with 13 and 17 goals respectively. Ahead of the 2003–04 season, he signed a one-year contract with Wolverhampton Wanderers, after a long time with injury problems. He scored Wolves' first ever Premier League goal but was not prolific, only scoring 4 goals in 18 outings.

=== Vålerenga and return to Rosenborg ===
In 2004, he moved back to Norway to play for Vålerenga where he played a crucial role during the 2005 season and won his third Tippeligaen, ten years after his first. His contract ended on 31 October 2005, and for months he was a free agent. Rumours abounded of several clubs showing their interest, including Mallorca, Everton and his previous club Vålerenga. On 10 February 2006 it was announced that he wanted to return to his old club Rosenborg, where his joining was officially announced on 13 February 2006. Iversen was Rosenborg's top scorer (18 goals) of the 2006–07 season and helped his team win the title, Iversen's fourth medal.

=== Crystal Palace ===
He was linked to a number of English Championship clubs in the summer of 2010; including Crystal Palace, Norwich City and Ipswich Town, before provisionally signing for Crystal Palace on 1 January 2011. In his debut match for Crystal Palace, he scored against Preston after 58 minutes, giving Palace their first win in five matches. He scored two goals in 19 matches during the 13 months he played for the Eagles, before he was released by the club on 31 January 2012.

=== Third spell at Rosenborg ===
Iversen joined Rosenborg for the third time in his career on 15 February 2012. He signed a performance-based one-year contract, with an option for one more year, and stated that he had returned to win the league. In November 2012 he decided to retire from football.

=== Trygg/Lade ===
Iversen joined lower division club Trygg/Lade as a player-manager in 2018. On 19 April 2018, he managed his team in a 2–4 defeat against his former club Rosenborg in the 2018 Norwegian Football Cup.

== International career ==
Iversen was a regular for the Norway U-21 and was a major contributor for the team that earned a third place in the 1998 UEFA U-21 Championship, by scoring Norway's all three goals during the championship, including two goals in the third-place match against Netherlands U-21. In total, he played 23 matches for the U-21 team, and scored 17 goals, a record.

Later the same year, he made his debut for the senior team in the UEFA Euro 2000 qualifier against Albania. He scored his first international goal on 20 May 1999 in the friendly match against Jamaica, a game Norway won 6–0.

In Norway's first match in a UEFA European Championship, Iversen scored the match-winning goal against Spain with a header. Iversen's goal is still Norway's only goal in a UEFA European Football Championship.

Iversen played regularly for the national team, until he in August 2008 overslept to a meeting with the squad that was to play a friendly match against Republic of Ireland on 20 August 2008 and was sent home by the national team coach Åge Hareide. Nevertheless, Iversen was called up for the next squad for the 2010 FIFA World Cup qualifier against Iceland where he scored Norway's two goals.

The UEFA Euro 2012 qualifier match against Denmark on 26 March 2011 was to be his last match for Norway. In total he achieved 79 caps – scoring 21 goals.

== Agent ==
His agent while at Tottenham and Wolves was Christian Eidem.

== Personal life ==
Iversen was married to Anna Crane.

== Career statistics ==
=== Club ===
Appearances and goals by club, season and competition
Club	Season	League			National cup (Note: Includes Norwegian Cup, FA Cup)		League cup (Note: Includes Football League Cup)		Europe		Other		Total	
Club	Season	Division	Apps	Goals	Apps	Goals	Apps	Goals	Apps	Goals	Apps	Goals	Apps	Goals
Rosenborg	1995	Tippeligaen	25	8	9	4	—		7 (Note: Appearances in UEFA Champions League)	1	—		41	13
Rosenborg	1996	Tippeligaen	25	10	4	4	—		8	2	—		37	16
Rosenborg	Total		50	18	13	8	—		15	3	—		78	29
Tottenham	1996–97	Premier League	16	6	0	0	0	0	—		—		16	6
Tottenham	1997–98	Premier League	13	0	0	0	0	0	—		—		13	0
Tottenham	1998–99	Premier League	27	9	7	2	6	2	—		—		40	13
Tottenham	1999–2000	Premier League	36	14	2	1	2	1	4 (Note: Appearances in UEFA Cup)	1	—		44	17
Tottenham	2000–01	Premier League	14	2	2	0	2	1	—		—		18	3
Tottenham	2001–02	Premier League	19	4	3	1	3	2	—		—		25	7
Tottenham	2002–03	Premier League	19	1	1	0	2	0	—		—		22	1
Tottenham	Total		144	36	14	4	15	6	4	1	—		178	47
Wolverhampton	2003–04	Premier League	16	4	2	0	2	0	—		—		20	4
Vålerenga	2004	Tippeligaen	11	4	0	0	—		—		8 (Note: Appearances in Royal League)	4	19	8
Vålerenga	2005	Tippeligaen	21	7	5	2	—		3	2	—		29	11
Vålerenga	Total		32	11	5	2	—		3	2	8	4	48	19
Rosenborg	2006	Tippeligaen	24	17	6	7	—		—		2	1	32	25
Rosenborg	2007	Tippeligaen	23	13	2	1	—		10	4	—		35	18
Rosenborg	2008	Tippeligaen	22	10	2	5	—		12	6	—		36	21
Rosenborg	2009	Tippeligaen	29	9	3	1	—		4 (Note: Appearances in UEFA Europa League)	1	—		36	11
Rosenborg	2010	Tippeligaen	30	14	5	3	—		12 (Note: Six appearances and one goal in UEFA Champions League, six appearances in UEFA Europa League)	1	1 (Note: Appearance in Superfinalen)	0	48	18
Rosenborg	Total		128	63	18	17	—		38	12	3	1	187	93
Crystal Palace	2010–11	Championship	17	2	1	0	0	0	—		—		18	2
Crystal Palace	2011–12	Championship	3	0	1	0	1	0	—		—		5	0
Crystal Palace	Total		20	2	2	0	1	0	—		—		23	2
Rosenborg	2012	Tippeligaen	21	6	2	2	—		9	0	—		32	8
Career total			411	140	57	33	18	6	69	18	11	5	566	202

=== International ===
Appearances and goals by national team and year
National team	Year	Apps	Goals
Norway	1998	2	0
Norway	1999	10	4
Norway	2000	10	2
Norway	2001	5	0
Norway	2002	8	1
Norway	2003	9	1
Norway	2004	4	3
Norway	2005	11	1
Norway	2006	5	1
Norway	2007	8	6
Norway	2008	4	2
Norway	2009	1	0
Norway	2010	1	0
Norway	2011	1	0
Total		79	21

Scores and results list Norway's goal tally first, score column indicates score after each Iversen goal.

List of international goals scored by Steffen Iversen
No.	Date	Venue	Opponent	Score	Result	Competition	Ref.
1	20 May 1999	Ullevaal Stadion, Oslo, Norway	Jamaica	3–0	6–0	Friendly	
2	30 May 1999	Ullevaal Stadion, Oslo, Norway	Georgia	1–0	1–0	UEFA Euro 2000 qualifying	
3	5 June 1999	Arena Kombëtare, Tirana, Albania	Albania	1–0	2–1	UEFA Euro 2000 qualifying	
4	8 September 1999	Ullevaal Stadion, Oslo, Norway	Slovenia	2–0	4–0	UEFA Euro 2000 qualifying	
5	27 May 2000	Ullevaal Stadion, Oslo, Norway	Slovakia	2–0	2–0	Friendly	
6	13 June 2000	De Kuip, Rotterdam, Netherlands	Spain	1–0	1–0	UEFA Euro 2000	
7	12 October 2002	Stadionul Steaua, Bucharest, Romania	Romania	1–0	1–0	UEFA Euro 2004 qualifying	
8	15 November 2003	Mestalla Stadium, Valencia, Spain	Spain	1–0	1–2	UEFA Euro 2004 qualifying	
9	18 February 2004	Windsor Park, Belfast, Northern Ireland	Northern Ireland	3–0	4–1	Friendly	
10	9 October 2004	Hampden Park, Glasgow, Scotland	Scotland	1–0	1–0	2006 FIFA World Cup qualification	
11	16 November 2004	Craven Cottage, London, England	Australia	1–0	2–2	Friendly	
12	8 June 2005	Råsunda Stadium, Stockholm, Sweden	Sweden	3–1	3–2	Friendly	
13	6 September 2006	Ullevaal Stadion, Oslo, Norway	Moldova	2–0	2–0	UEFA Euro 2008 qualifying	
14	2 June 2007	Ullevaal Stadion, Oslo, Norway	Malta	3–0	4–0	UEFA Euro 2008 qualifying	
15	6 June 2007	Ullevaal Stadion, Oslo, Norway	Hungary	1–0	4–0	UEFA Euro 2008 qualifying	
16	8 September 2007	Zimbru Stadium, Chișinău, Moldova	Moldova	1–0	1–0	UEFA Euro 2008 qualifying	
17	21 November 2007	National Stadium, Ta' Qali, Malta	Malta	1–0	4–1	UEFA Euro 2008 qualifying	
18	21 November 2007	National Stadium, Ta' Qali, Malta	Malta	2–0	4–1	UEFA Euro 2008 qualifying	
19	21 November 2007	National Stadium, Ta' Qali, Malta	Malta	3–0	4–1	UEFA Euro 2008 qualifying	
20	6 September 2008	Ullevaal Stadion, Oslo, Norway	Iceland	1–0	2–2	2010 FIFA World Cup qualification	
21	6 September 2008	Ullevaal Stadion, Oslo, Norway	Iceland	2–1	2–2	2010 FIFA World Cup qualification	

== Honours ==
Rosenborg

- Tippeligaen: 1995, 1996, 2006, 2009, 2010
- Norwegian Football Cup: 1995
- Superfinalen: 2010

Tottenham Hotspur

- Football League Cup: 1998–99; runner-up: 2001–02

Vålerenga

- Tippeligaen: 2005

Individual

- Tippeligaen Player of the Year: 2006
- Kniksen Award Striker of the Year: 2006
- Tippeligaen Player of the Month: September 2006
- Norwegian Football Association Gold Watch
