= Alton Thelwell =

English footballer (born 1980)

Personal information
- Full name: Alton Anthony Thelwell
- Date of birth: 5 September 1980 (age 46)
- Place of birth: Islington, England
- Height: 1.83 m (6 ft 0 in)
- Position: Defender

Senior career*
Years	Team	Apps	(Gls)
1998–2003	Tottenham Hotspur	18	(0)
2000	→ IFK Hässleholm (loan)		
2003–2007	Hull City	40	(1)
2006–2007	→ Leyton Orient (loan)	6	(1)
2007–2009	Leyton Orient	72	(0)
2009	London APSA	2	(0)
2009	Newport County	8	(0)
2009–2010	Kettering Town	9	(0)
2012	Carshalton Athletic	10	(0)
2012–2013	Billericay Town		

International career
2001	England U21	1	(0)
- * Club domestic league appearances and goals

Alton Anthony Thelwell (born 5 September 1980) is an English former footballer who played as a defender.

== Career ==
Thelwell was born in Islington, London. He began his career at Tottenham Hotspur, for whom he made twenty-one appearances in league and cup competitions. In the summer of 2000, IFK Hässleholm of the fourth-highest division in Sweden, sold Jon Jönsson to Tottenham for £70,000 and also agreed two loan deals for the Swedish club - that of Thelwell and Peter Crouch. He also won one England under-21 cap on 27 February 2001, as a substitute in the 4–0 defeat at home to Spain U21. However injuries robbed him of further first-team opportunities at Spurs, and he was released by then boss Glenn Hoddle in 2003.

Thelwell signed for Hull City on 13 June 2003 by manager Peter Taylor after being released from Tottenham. He scored on his debut against Darlington. Fitness problems blighted Thelwell's time at Hull City, and he missed over a year from October 2004 to February 2006 due to a serious knee injury. He signed a new short-term contract in January 2006, and after proving his fitness and featuring in nine of City's last thirteen games of the 2005–06 season, Thelwell was rewarded with a further year's contract extension.

Finding his first team opportunities at the KC Stadium limited, he joined Leyton Orient on loan in October 2006, making his debut in the League One fixture against Cheltenham Town on 21 October 2006, Orient winning 2–0.

Despite his persistent knee injury, Thelwell impressed during his loan spell and was rewarded with a permanent 18-month contract when the transfer window reopened on 1 January 2007. He was named as Leyton Orient club captain at the start of the 2007–08 season, and signed a new one-year contract in May 2008. He was released in May 2009.

Thelwell subsequently had trials at Bournemouth, Milton Keynes Dons, Gillingham and Mansfield Town. He also played two games for London APSA of the Essex Senior League to keep up his match fitness. In October 2009, he joined Newport County, making his debut on 11 October in the 1–0 FA Cup Third round qualifying defeat at Paulton Rovers. On 1 December 2009, Thelwell left Newport and joined Kettering Town on a free transfer, but retired after nine games through injury.

Thelwell returned to football and joined Carshalton Athletic in the autumn of 2012 on a non-contract basis as the club was suffering from a defensive crisis. He made ten appearances for The Robins before moving on to Billericay Town, who were then playing in the Conference South.
