= Øyvind Leonhardsen =

Norwegian footballer (born 1970)

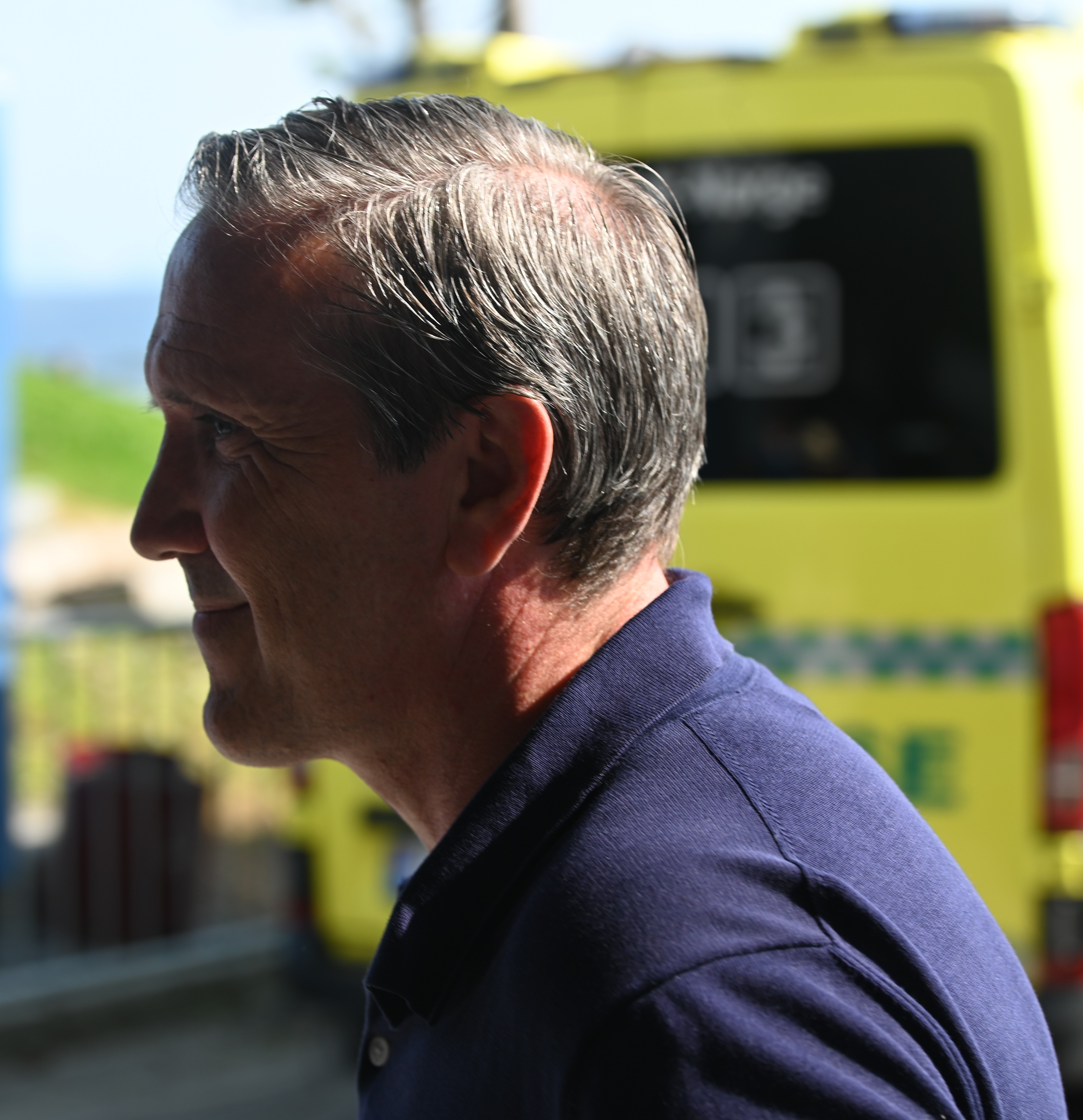

Personal information
- Full name: Øyvind Leonhardsen
- Date of birth: 17 August 1970 (age 56)
- Place of birth: Kristiansund, Norway
- Height: 1.77 m (5 ft 10 in)
- Position: Midfielder

Youth career
- 1987–1989: Clausenengen FK

Senior career*
Years	Team	Apps	(Gls)
1989–1991	Molde	64	(9)
1992–1994	Rosenborg	63	(20)
1994–1997	Wimbledon	78	(13)
1997–1999	Liverpool	37	(7)
1999–2002	Tottenham Hotspur	54	(7)
2002–2003	Aston Villa	19	(3)
2004–2005	Lyn	46	(2)
2006–2007	Strømsgodset	41	(7)
Total		402	(68)

International career
1990–2003	Norway	86	(19)

Managerial career
- 2009–2011: Lyn (youth)
- 2012–2017: Stabæk (youth)
- 2018–: Mjøndalen (assistant)
- * Club domestic league appearances and goals

Øyvind Leonhardsen (born 17 August 1970) is a Norwegian former professional footballer who played as a midfielder. He retired after the 2007 season, ending a career with nine years in English football at clubs Wimbledon, Liverpool, Tottenham Hotspur, and Aston Villa, and in Norway he played for Molde, Rosenborg, Lyn, and Strømsgodset. Between 1990 and 2003 he made 86 appearances for the Norway national team scoring 19 goals.

== Club career ==
=== In Norway ===
Leonhardsen started his career in Clausenengen before he, as a 19-year-old, moved to Premier Division side Molde in 1989. Two years later he was brought to Norwegian champions Rosenborg.

Leonhardsen won the honorable Kniksen award as the best midfielder in 1989, 1991, 1992 and 1993. He was voted the Player's Player of the Year in Norway in 1994.

=== In England ===
Leonhardsen moved to Wimbledon in the Premier League the following season, where he made an instant impact on the left wing. He spent three seasons with Wimbledon, and helped them reach the semi-finals of both the FA Cup and Football League Cup in his final season there. He was sold to Liverpool for £3.5million in May 1997, and was initially a regular member of the first team under the management of Roy Evans.

After Gerard Houllier's continental revolution of Liverpool from 1999, Leonhardsen fell out of favour at Anfield and was sold to Tottenham Hotspur, before joining Aston Villa on a free transfer in August 2002.

=== Return to Norway ===
Leonhardsen moved back to Norway in 2004 to join FC Lyn Oslo, where he became the captain. He signed a two-year contract with second-level club Strømsgodset IF from Drammen in December 2005.

Leonhardsen retired aged 37 after helping securing Strømsgodset's promotion to Tippeligaen in 2006, and later retaining their place in the league in 2007.

Leonhardsen began working as a youth coach at his former club Lyn. In 2018 he became assistant coach of Mjøndalen IF.

== International career ==
Leonhardsen made 86 appearances for the Norway national team, scoring 19 goals. He was part of the 1994 and 1998 FIFA World Cup squads.

In Norway, the expression "a Leo run" is derived from Leonhardsen's running capacity and smart movements. He seemed to have an uncanny instinct for anticipating when and where a loose ball would present him with a scoring chance, directing and timing his runs to make sure he'd be there to exploit it - hence his impressive scoring rate for a midfielder. He is reckoned as somewhat of a cult hero and a symbol of the Norway national team success in the 1990s. He earned great respect during his career due to his highly professional approach to the game.

== Career statistics ==
=== International ===
Appearances and goals by national team and year
National team	Year	Apps	Goals
Norway	1990	3	0
Norway	1991	7	1
Norway	1992	8	4
Norway	1993	8	3
Norway	1994	9	1
Norway	1995	8	2
Norway	1996	6	1
Norway	1997	4	0
Norway	1998	6	1
Norway	1999	7	3
Norway	2000	3	0
Norway	2001	5	2
Norway	2002	9	0
Norway	2003	3	1
Total		86	19

Scores and results list Norway's goal tally first, score column indicates score after each Leonhardsen goal.

List of international goals scored by Øyvind Leonhardsen
No.	Date	Venue	Opponent	Score	Result	Competition	Ref.
1	8 August 1991	Ullevaal Stadion, Oslo, Norway	Sweden	1–0	1–2	Friendly	
2	4 February 1992	Bermuda National Stadium, Devonshire Parish, Bermuda	Bermuda	1–1	3–1	Friendly	
3	4 February 1992	Bermuda National Stadium, Devonshire Parish, Bermuda	Bermuda	2–1	3–1	Friendly	
4	4 February 1992	Bermuda National Stadium, Devonshire Parish, Bermuda	Bermuda	3–1	3–1	Friendly	
5	26 August 1992	Ullevaal Stadion, Oslo, Norway	Sweden	1–0	2–2	Friendly	
6	30 March 1993	Khalifa International Stadium, Doha, Qatar	Qatar	1–0	6–1	Friendly	
7	2 June 1993	Ullevaal Stadion, Oslo, Norway	England	1–0	2–0	1994 FIFA World Cup qualification	
8	11 August 1993	Svangaskarð, Toftir, Faroe Islands	Faroe Islands	2–0	7–0	Friendly	
9	16 November 1994	Dinamo Stadium, Minsk, Belarus	Belarus	2–0	4–0	UEFA Euro 1996 qualifying	
10	8 February 1995	Makario Stadium, Nicosia, Cyprus	Cyprus	1–0	2–0	Friendly	
11	29 March 1995	Stade Josy Barthel, Luxembourg City, Luxembourg	Luxembourg	1–0	2–0	UEFA Euro 1996 qualifying	
12	10 November 1996	Stadion Wankdorf, Bern, Switzerland	Switzerland	1–0	1–0	1998 FIFA World Cup qualification	
13	22 April 1998	Parken Stadium, Copenhagen, Denmark	Denmark	1–0	2–0	Friendly	
14	20 May 1999	Ullevaal Stadion, Oslo, Norway	Jamaica	4–0	6–0	Friendly	
15	4 September 1999	Ullevaal Stadion, Oslo, Norway	Greece	1–0	1–0	UEFA Euro 2000 qualifying	
16	8 September 1999	Ullevaal Stadion, Oslo, Norway	Slovenia	4–0	4–0	UEFA Euro 2000 qualifying	
17	25 April 2001	Ullevaal Stadion, Oslo, Norway	Bulgaria	1–1	2–1	Friendly	
18	25 April 2001	Ullevaal Stadion, Oslo, Norway	Bulgaria	2–1	2–1	Friendly	
19	22 May 2003	Ullevaal Stadion, Oslo, Norway	Finland	1–0	2–0	Friendly	
