= 1999–2000 Southampton F.C. season =

Southampton F.C.
1999–2000 season
- Chairman: Rupert Lowe
- Manager: Dave Jones (until 27 January 2000); Glenn Hoddle (from 28 January 2000)
- Stadium: The Dell
- FA Premier League: 15th
- FA Cup: Fourth round
- League Cup: Fourth round
- Top goalscorer: League: Marians Pahars (13); All: Marians Pahars (13)
- Highest home attendance: 15,257 v West Ham; United (5 February 2000)
- Lowest home attendance: 10,960 v Manchester; City (21 September 1999)
- Average home league attendance: 15,132
- Biggest win: 4–2 v Newcastle United (15 August 1999); 2–0 (multiple games)
- Biggest defeat: 0–5 v Newcastle United (16 January 2000); 2–7 v Tottenham; Hotspur (11 March 2000)
Home colours	Away colours

The 1999–2000 Southampton F.C. season was the club's 99th season of competitive football, their 30th (and 22nd consecutive) in the top flight of English football, and their eighth in the FA Premier League. After securing their Premier League survival on the final day of the previous season, the Saints fared slightly better in 1999–2000 as the club finished 15th in the table, eight points above the relegation zone. Outside the league, they reached the fourth round of both the FA Cup and the League Cup. 1999–2000 was Southampton's last season to feature Dave Jones as manager – he was suspended in January 2000 whilst facing charges of child abuse in a previous job, with Glenn Hoddle taking his place temporarily. Although the case against Jones was dismissed, Hoddle remained in charge after the season ended.

After barely retaining their top-flight status the year before, Southampton made two key signings in the summer of 1999, bringing in centre-back Dean Richards and midfielder Trond Egil Soltvedt. They also re-signed striker Kevin Davies, who returned from Blackburn Rovers in exchange for Egil Østenstad, the previous season's top scorer. Other new arrivals throughout the season included Portuguese winger Luís Boa Morte, Norwegian midfielder Jo Tessem, Latvian midfielder Imants Bleidelis, and Moroccan defender Tahar El Khalej. The club picked up regular victories throughout the campaign, remaining clear of the bottom three of the league table for the whole year. Their form was slightly better under Hoddle when he took over as manager, with their FA Premier League status for 2000–01 confirmed with five games left to play.

Outside the league, Southampton improved on their previous season's performances in both the FA Cup and the League Cup. In the former, the Saints made it past First Division promotion hopefuls Ipswich Town in the third round with a slender 1–0 victory. They were knocked out in the fourth round by the same scoreline at the hands of Aston Villa, who would end the season in the top six of the FA Premier League. In the League Cup, Southampton beat Manchester City in the second round, winning the second leg 4–3 after extra time following a goalless first leg. In the third round, they beat FA Premier League high-flyers Liverpool 2–1, thanks to a last-minute goal from Trond Egil Soltvedt. They were eliminated in the fourth round by Aston Villa, who beat the Saints 4–0 just over a month before also eliminating them from the FA Cup.

Southampton used 29 players during the 1999–2000 season and had 15 different goalscorers. Latvian striker Marians Pahars finished as the club's top goalscorer for the first time, scoring 13 goals in the FA Premier League – more than twice as many as the second-highest scorer, Kevin Davies, on six league goals. Dean Richards made the most appearances for the side during his first of two seasons at the club, playing in 40 of the team's 44 fixtures across all competitions, and was named Southampton F.C. Player of the Season at the end of the campaign. The average league attendance at The Dell during 1999–2000 was 15,132. The highest attendance was 15,257 against West Ham United in February (Hoddle's first game in charge) and the lowest was 10,960 against Manchester City in the League Cup in September.

== Background and transfers ==
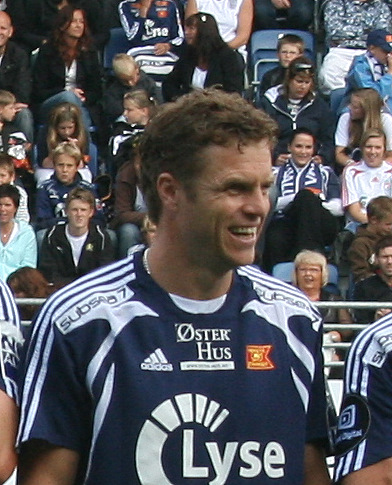
Southampton's first major signing of the summer was Trond Egil Soltvedt, who joined from Coventry City for £300,000.

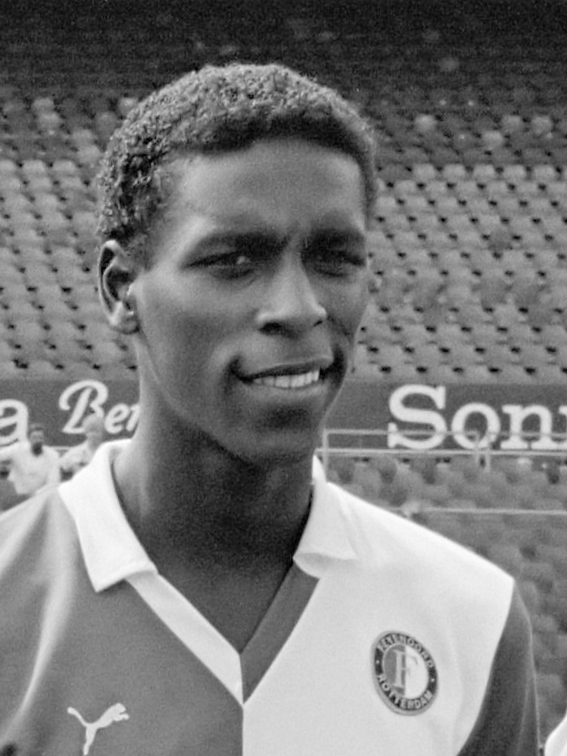
Centre-back Ken Monkou left after seven years in 1999.

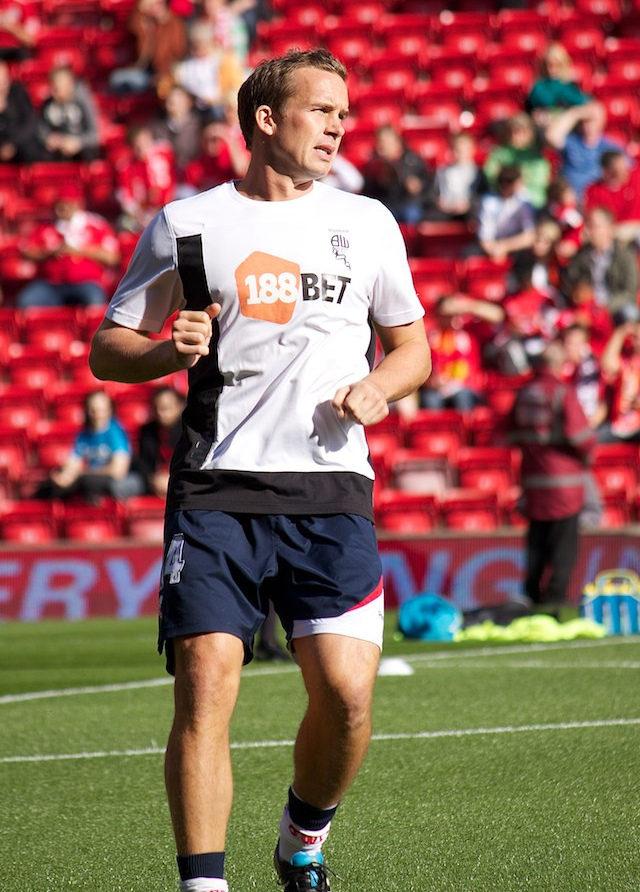
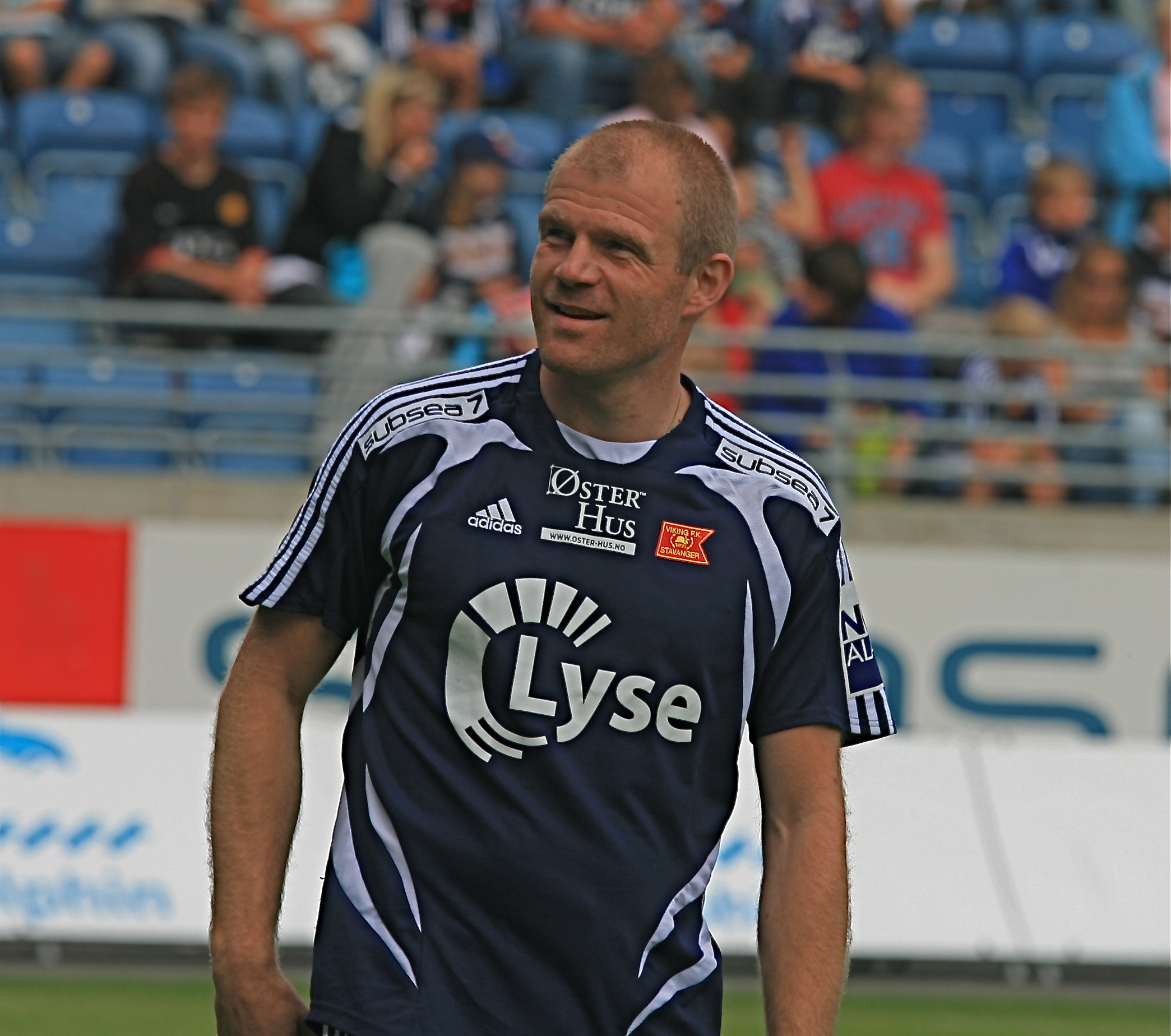
Kevin Davies (top) returned after one season at Blackburn Rovers, with Egil Østenstad (bottom) moving the other way.
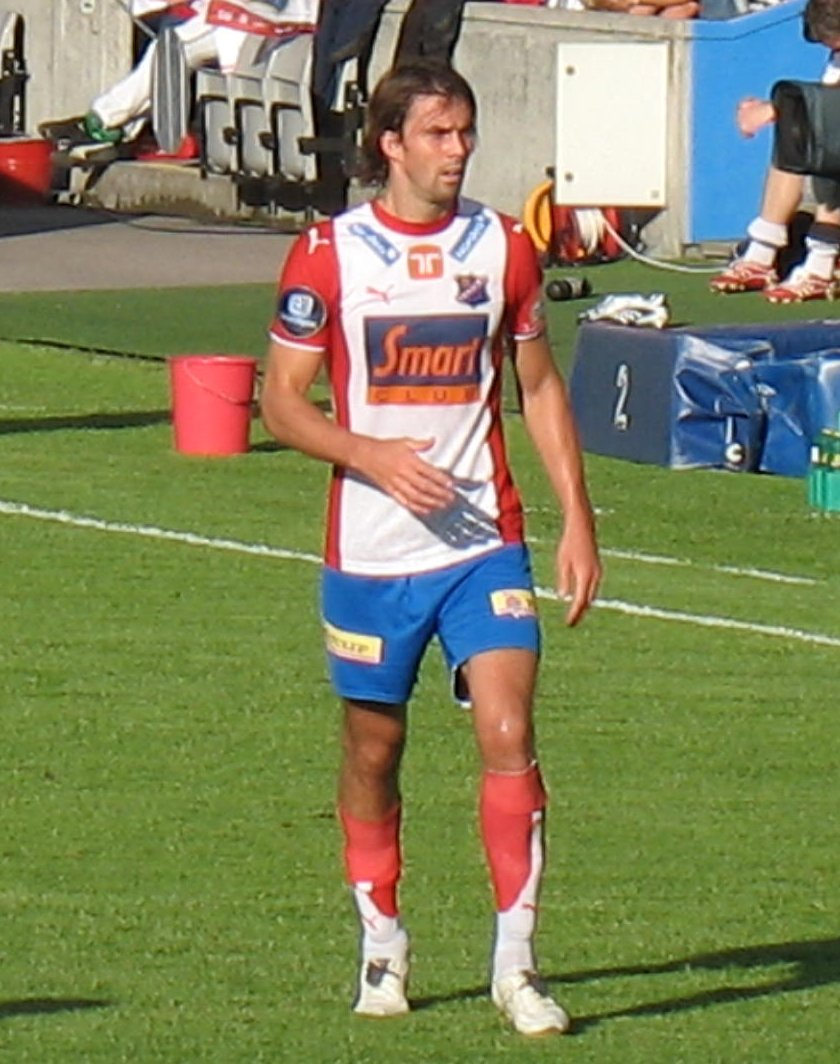
The club signed Jo Tessem, another Norwegian midfielder, from Molde in November.

Having spent much of the previous season on loan at the club, in the summer of 1999 striker Steve Basham left Southampton to join Preston North End in the Second Division for a fee of £200,000. Danish goalkeeper Michael Stensgaard, who had joined from Copenhagen just seven months earlier, returned to his former club having failed to make an appearance for the Saints. The club's sole signings prior to the start of the league season were defenders Bruno Leal and Dean Richards, who arrived from Portuguese side Sporting and First Division side Wolverhampton Wanderers, respectively, on free transfers. The day after the second game in the league, Southampton signed Norwegian attacking midfielder Trond Egil Soltvedt from Coventry City for £300,000. He was followed just under a week later by striker Kevin Davies, who returned to the club having left for Blackburn Rovers the previous summer for a Saints record fee of £7.5 million; in exchange, Southampton's 1998–99 top scorer Egil Østenstad moved to the recently relegated Rovers. Ken Monkou left on the same day to join second-flight side Huddersfield Town on a free transfer, while Portuguese winger Luís Boa Morte arrived from Arsenal for a fee of £500,000 a week later.

Changes to the squad continued throughout much of the season. During September, the club sent Kevin Gibbens, Garry Monk, Andy Williams and Shayne Bradley all out on loans – all but Bradley to Stockport County, Bradley to Exeter City. Williams' loan was made permanent at the beginning of October. That same month, John Beresford was loaned out to Birmingham City, while Scott Marshall was loaned out – and eventually sold, for £250,000 – to Brentford. In November, Richard Dryden was sent out on loan to Stoke City, where he would spend much of the rest of the season over two separate spells. Also in November, the club made their sixth signing of the season when they brought in Norwegian midfielder Jo Tessem from Molde, against whom they'd played in pre-season, for £600,000. December saw the £50,000 sale of Scott Hiley to local rivals Portsmouth, as well as the cancellation of a season-long loan deal for Portuguese centre-back Marco Almeida, who had made just one substitute appearance for the club since arriving in July.

In January, striker David Hirst was forced to retire from professional football due to a knee injury he had picked up during the 1998–99 pre-season period. He subsequently joined Sheffield-based non-league side Brunsmeer Athletic. The next month, following extended negotiations to secure a work permit, Latvian winger Imants Bleidelis joined from Skonto – the same club from which the Saints signed Marians Pahars a year earlier – for £600,000. In March, striker Mark Hughes was offloaded to Everton on a free transfer after a disappointing 20-month stay at the club which delivered only two goals. Moroccan centre-back Tahar El Khalej joined from Benfica the same month, as did free midfielder Paul Hughes, who had played under Hoddle at Chelsea. Dryden started his second loan spell at Stoke City just before the transfer deadline, remaining until the end of the season.

Players transferred in

Name	Nationality	Pos.	Club	Date	Fee	Ref.
Bruno Leal	Portugal	DF	(Portugal) Sporting	8 July 1999	Free	
Dean Richards	England	DF	(England) Wolverhampton Wanderers	14 July 1999	Free	
Trond Egil Soltvedt	Norway	MF	(England) Coventry City	12 August 1999	£300,000	
Kevin Davies	England	FW	(England) Blackburn Rovers	17 August 1999	Exchange	
Luís Boa Morte	Portugal	MF	(England) Arsenal	25 August 1999	£500,000	
Jo Tessem	Norway	MF	(Norway) Molde	20 November 1999	£600,000	
Imants Bleidelis	Latvia	MF	(Latvia) Skonto	2 February 2000	£600,000	
Tahar El Khalej	Morocco	DF	(Portugal) Benfica	10 March 2000	£350,000	
Paul Hughes	England	MF	(England) Chelsea	23 March 2000	Free	

Players transferred out

Name	Nationality	Pos.	Club	Date	Fee	Ref.
Stephen Jenkins	England	DF	(England) Brentford	10 June 1999	Free	
Steve Basham	England	FW	(England) Preston North End	15 June 1999	£200,000	
Michael Stensgaard	Denmark	GK	(Denmark) Copenhagen	1 July 1999	Free	
Ken Monkou	Netherlands	DF	(England) Huddersfield Town	17 August 1999	Free	
Egil Østenstad	Norway	FW	(England) Blackburn Rovers	17 August 1999	Exchange	
Andy Williams	Wales	DF	(England) Swindon Town	1 October 1999	£65,000	
Scott Marshall	Scotland	DF	(England) Brentford	29 October 1999	£250,000	
Scott Hiley	England	DF	(England) Portsmouth	3 December 1999	£50,000	
David Hirst	England	FW	(England) Brunsmeer Athletic	25 January 2000	Free	
Mark Hughes	Wales	FW	(England) Everton	14 March 2000	Free	

Players loaned in

Name	Nationality	Pos.	Club	Date from	Date to	Ref.
Marco Almeida	Portugal	DF	(Portugal) Sporting	20 July 1999	9 December 1999	

Players loaned out

Name	Nationality	Pos.	Club	Date from	Date to	Ref.
Kevin Gibbens	England	MF	(England) Stockport County	9 September 1999	30 September 1999	
Garry Monk	England	DF	(England) Stockport County	9 September 1999	30 September 1999	
Andy Williams	Wales	DF	(England) Swindon Town	9 September 1999	30 September 1999	
Shayne Bradley	England	FW	(England) Exeter City	17 September 1999	3 November 1999	
John Beresford	England	DF	(England) Birmingham City	6 October 1999	13 October 1999	
Scott Marshall	Scotland	DF	(England) Brentford	15 October 1999	26 October 1999	
Richard Dryden	England	DF	(England) Stoke City	2 November 1999	7 December 1999	
Richard Dryden	England	DF	(England) Stoke City	22 March 2000	End of season	

== Pre-season friendlies ==
Ahead of the 1999–2000 season, Southampton played seven pre-season friendlies. In the first two, the club faced Isthmian League side Aldershot Town and Conference side Kingstonian on the same day in July, winning 3–2 and 2–1, respectively. A few days later, they faced three local sides as part of a short Norwegian tour, winning 3–1 against Førde, drawing 1–1 with Molde, and losing 1–3 to Viking. Another defeat in Europe, 0–1 at Belgian side Lierse, was followed by a 3–0 win over Second Division side Reading, with Matt Le Tissier and Egil Østenstad (two) on the scoresheet for the visitors.

13 July 1999 Friendly	Aldershot Town	2–3	Southampton	Aldershot
			Kachloul; Le Tissier; Wallace	Stadium: Recreation Ground

13 July 1999 Friendly	Kingstonian	1–2	Southampton	London
			Østenstad	Stadium: Kingsmeadow

17 July 1999 Friendly	(Norway) Førde	1–3	Southampton	Førde, Norway
			M. Hughes; Østenstad; Pahars	Stadium: Førde Stadion

19 July 1999 Friendly	(Norway) Molde	1–1	Southampton	Molde, Norway
			Kachloul	Stadium: Aker Stadion

24 July 1999 Friendly	(Norway) Viking	3–1	Southampton	Stavanger, Norway
			Østenstad	Stadium: Stavanger Stadion

28 July 1999 Friendly	(Belgium) Lierse	1–0	Southampton	Lier, Belgium
				Stadium: Herman Vanderpoortenstadion

31 July 1999 Friendly	Reading	0–3	Southampton	Reading
			Le Tissier; Østenstad	Stadium: Madejski Stadium

== FA Premier League ==
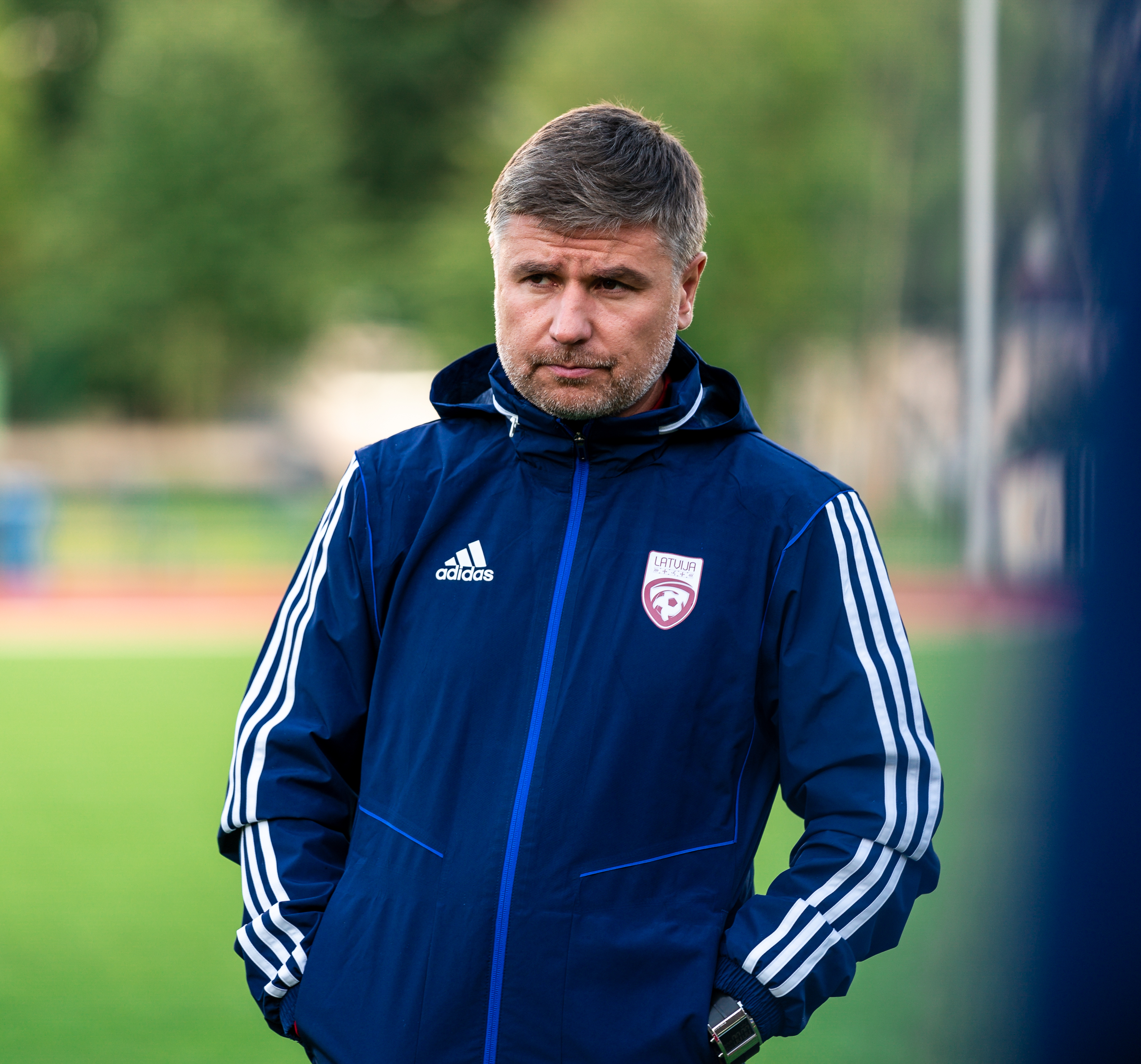
Marians Pahars scored 13 league goals in 1999–2000, finishing the season as Southampton's top scorer.

For the first time since the 1988–89 season, Southampton won their opening league fixture at the start of the 1999–2000 campaign, beating Coventry City 1–0 at Highfield Road thanks to a late goal from the previous season's top scorer, Egil Østenstad. They lost their first home game 0–3 to Leeds United four days later, with Michael Bridges scoring a hat-trick. This was followed by a second win from three when the Saints beat Newcastle United 4–2 at home, with second-half goals from Hassan Kachloul (two), Marians Pahars and Mark Hughes sending the South Coast side to 6th in the league table. Following the sale of Østenstad to Blackburn Rovers in exchange for the return of Kevin Davies, Southampton lost 1–4 at Everton but beat Sheffield Wednesday 2–0 at home to see out August. The side sat 9th in the table at the end of the month.

The club's form dipped dramatically starting in September, when they lost 2–3 at Middlesbrough and 0–1 at home to Arsenal. In the first game, new winger Luís Boa Morte was sent off in his debut for the club, after which the hosts overturned Southampton's 2–1 lead to make the most of the advantage; in the second, the tie was decided by Thierry Henry's first league goal for the Gunners, scored when he beat another debutant, loanee Marco Almeida, who was ultimately making his only appearance for the club. Two 3–3 draws followed, against defending league champions Manchester United at Old Trafford and at home to Derby County, the latter of which saw the Saints "carelessly surrender" the win by conceding twice late on. The winless run continued through October, as Southampton lost 1–2 at Leicester City, before sacrificing another four points from winning positions when they drew 1–1 with both Liverpool and Wimbledon. A first win in eight games, a late 1–0 victory over Aston Villa, ensured that the side held their position at 14th place in the table.

Southampton saw out 1999 with another poor run of form, failing to pick up a win in their last seven games of the calendar year. The only point they picked up during this period was in a goalless draw at home to Coventry City at the beginning of December. The first two games after the win over Aston Villa saw the Saints ending with ten men and conceding late goals – in a home tie against Tottenham Hotspur, they conceded in the 81st minute before Claus Lundekvam was sent off in the penultimate minute; and in an away trip to Leeds United, they saw Patrick Colleter dismissed in the 88th minute before conceding the only goal of the game in the 90th. Other defeats were faced at the hands of two sides recently promoted to the Premier League, as the Saints lost 0–2 at Sunderland and 2–3 at Watford. Against the third promoted side, Bradford City, Southampton won 1–0 at The Dell in their opening game of 2000, which helped them stay clear of the relegation zone at the Bantams' expense.

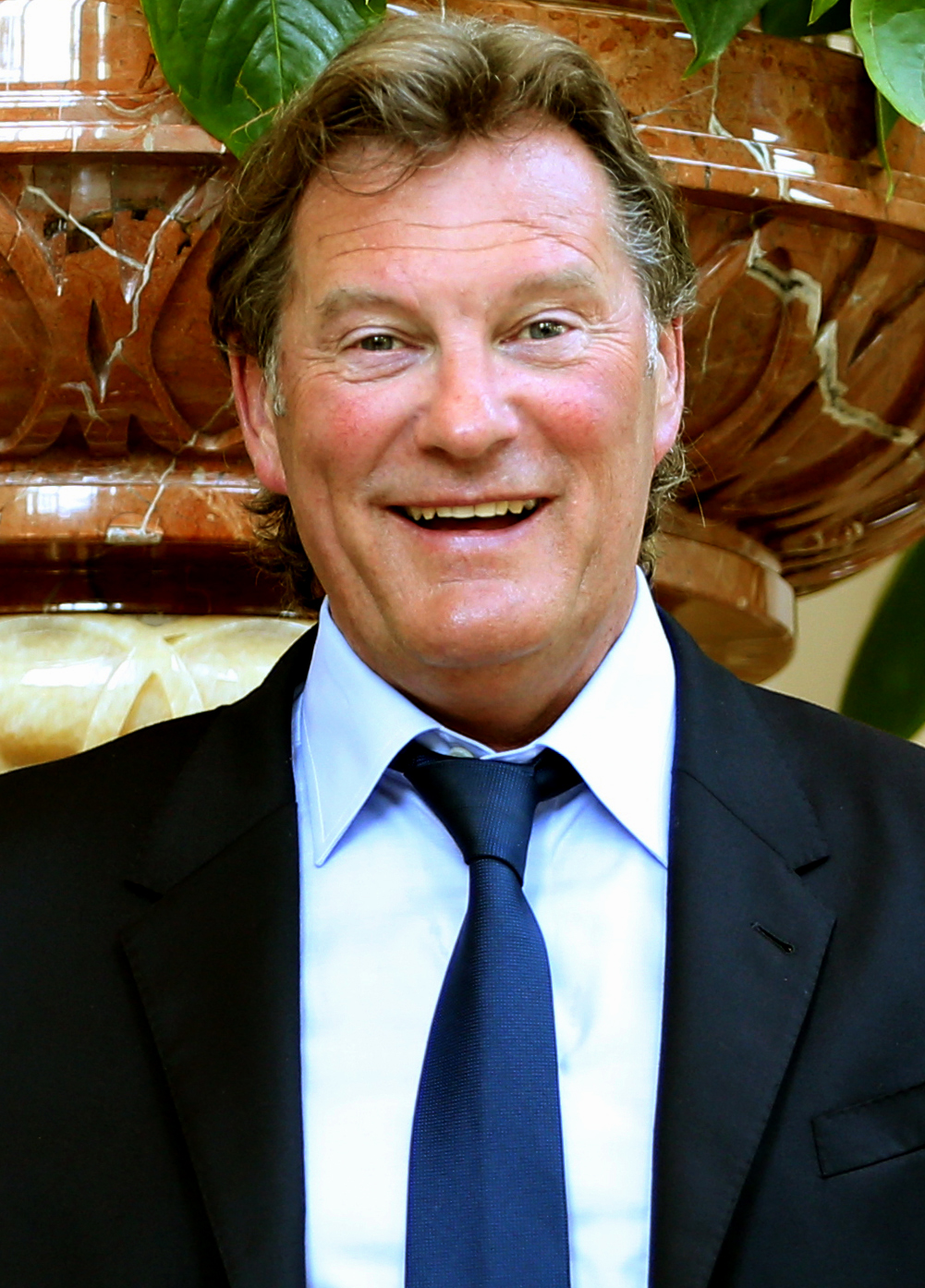
Glenn Hoddle replaced Dave Jones as Southampton manager in January 2000.

After picking up their first win in two months over Bradford City, Southampton faced their joint-heaviest defeat of the season at Newcastle United, who were just one place above them in the table at the time. Trailing 0–2 within three minutes, the Saints conceded two own goals courtesy of Richard Dryden and Garry Monk either side of half time to complete a 0–5 thrashing at St James' Park. This was followed by a 2–0 home win over Everton, who had been unbeaten in eight games. The win marked the last match to feature Dave Jones as manager, who was given a one-year leave of absence and replaced by Glenn Hoddle on 28 January. Jones' future with the club had been in doubt since the beginning of the season, when he had first been charged with offences against children allegedly committed during his time working in a children's home after his retirement from playing. In a statement about the change in manager, Southampton chairman Rupert Lowe assured fans that Jones had not been fired, but instead given a year away to "concentrate fully on his defence and the clearing of his name". Jones was ultimately cleared of all allegations in December 2000, although he did not return to Southampton and had his contract "paid up" by the club.

Hoddle's first two games as Southampton manager saw the club picking up their first consecutive wins of the campaign, following the Everton victory with a 2–1 win over West Ham United and a 1–0 win over bottom-placed Sheffield Wednesday. The side began to flounder again, however, with defeats at Arsenal and West Ham flanking a 1–1 draw with Middlesbrough which left the club 16th in the league table. This was followed by the club's joint-heaviest defeat of the campaign and their second game in successive seasons conceding seven goals, when they lost 2–7 to Tottenham Hotspur. The game started well for the Saints, with Jo Tessem opening the scoring in the 26th minute, although it was quickly 1–1 thanks to a Dean Richards own goal; debutant Tahar El Khalej put the visitors ahead again 12 minutes before half-time, but by the break it was 4–2 to Spurs when Darren Anderton, Chris Armstrong and Steffen Iversen all scored in quick succession. In the second half, Armstrong doubled his tally and Iversen completed a hat-trick.

Now just four points clear of the relegation zone, the Saints picked up a 2–0 win over Aston Villa and gained a point at 4th-place Chelsea to move up to 15th in the table, eight points clear of the bottom three, where they would remain for the remainder of the season. They continued to pick up points against fellow strugglers, beating Bradford City 2–1 thanks to a goal from Pahars within 30 seconds of coming on as a substitute, and winning 2–0 against bottom-placed Watford. A poor run of results at the end of April saw Southampton lose 1–3 at home to Manchester United (who secured their second consecutive league title as a result), 0–2 at Derby County (who were just one place below the Saints), and 1–2 at home to Leicester City (in which Richards was sent off in the final minute). The club had already secured its Premier League status for another season, but picked up four points from their last two games to secure their 15th-place finish, drawing 0–0 with Liverpool at Anfield before beating Wimbledon 2–0 on the final day, in which Wayne Bridge scored his first senior goal.

=== List of match results ===
7 August 1999 1	Coventry City	0–1	Southampton	Coventry
15:00 BST		Report	Østenstad 85', (yellow card); Dodd (yellow card)	Stadium: Highfield Road; Attendance: 19,915; Referee: Peter Jones

11 August 1999 2	Southampton	0–3	Leeds United	Southampton
19:45 BST	Benali (yellow card); M. Hughes (yellow card); Le Tissier (yellow card); Østenstad (yellow card)	Report	Bridges 11', 51', 72'; Batty (yellow card); Bakke (yellow card); Bowyer (yellow card); Duberry (yellow card); Mills (yellow card)	Stadium: The Dell; Attendance: 15,206; Referee: Alan Wiley

15 August 1999 3	Southampton	4–2	Newcastle United	Southampton
16:00 BST	Kachloul 58', 68'; Pahars 66'; M. Hughes 78', (yellow card); Benali (yellow card)	Report	Shearer 22' (pen.); Speed 84'	Stadium: The Dell; Attendance: 15,030; Referee: David Elleray

21 August 1999 4	Everton	4–1	Southampton	Liverpool
15:00 BST	Gough 36'; Lundekvam 47' (o.g.); Jeffers 48'; Campbell 54'; Hutchison (yellow card)	Report	Pahars 70'; Bradley (yellow card); Davies (yellow card); M. Hughes (yellow card)	Stadium: Goodison Park; Attendance: 35,316; Referee: Barry Knight

28 August 1999 5	Southampton	2–0	Sheffield Wednesday	Southampton
15:00 BST	Kachloul 53'; Oakley 84'	Report	Atherton (yellow card); Scott (yellow card); Sibon (yellow card)	Stadium: The Dell; Attendance: 14,815; Referee: Paul Alcock

11 September 1999 6	Middlesbrough	3–2	Southampton	Middlesbrough
15:00 BST	Pallister 17'; Gascoigne 67' (pen.); Deane 78', (yellow card); Cooper (yellow card); Ricard (yellow card)	Report	Kachloul 15'; Pahars 55'; Boa Morte (red card) 66'	Stadium: Riverside Stadium; Attendance: 32,165; Referee: Stephen Lodge

18 September 1999 7	Southampton	0–1	Arsenal	Southampton
15:00 BST	Beattie (yellow card); Dodd (yellow card); Oakley (yellow card)	Report	Henry 79'; Grimandi (yellow card); Winterburn (yellow card)	Stadium: The Dell; Attendance: 15,242; Referee: Graham Barber

25 September 1999 8	Manchester United	3–3	Southampton	Manchester
15:00 BST	Sheringham 34'; Yorke 37', 64'; Berg (yellow card); Scholes (yellow card)	Report	Pahars 17'; Le Tissier 51', 73'	Stadium: Old Trafford; Attendance: 55,249; Referee: Steve Dunn

4 October 1999 9	Southampton	3–3	Derby County	Southampton
20:00 BST	Pahars 22'; Oakley 35'; Ripley 66'; M. Hughes (yellow card)	Report	Delap 21'; Laursen 75', (yellow card); Beck 90'; Hoult (yellow card); Johnson (yellow card); Powell (yellow card); Prior (yellow card); Schnoor (yellow card)	Stadium: The Dell; Attendance: 14,208; Referee: Graham Poll

16 October 1999 10	Leicester City	2–1	Southampton	Leicester
15:00 BST	Guppy 8'; Cottee 39'; Heskey (yellow card); Savage (yellow card)	Report	Davies (red card) 76'; Kachloul (yellow card); Lundekvam (yellow card)	Stadium: Filbert Street; Attendance: 19,556; Referee: Barry Knight

23 October 1999 11	Southampton	1–1	Liverpool	Southampton
15:00 BST	Soltvedt 39'; Dodd (yellow card); Oakley (yellow card)	Report	Camara 81'; Henchoz (yellow card)	Stadium: The Dell; Attendance: 15,241; Referee: Neale Barry

30 October 1999 12	Wimbledon	1–1	Southampton	London
15:00 GMT	Gayle 89'; Cort (yellow card); Hreiðarsson (yellow card)	Report		Stadium: Selhurst Park; Attendance: 15,754; Referee: Peter Jones

6 November 1999 13	Aston Villa	0–1	Southampton	Birmingham
15:00 GMT	Thompson (yellow card)	Report	Richards 84', (yellow card); Colleter (yellow card); Kachloul (yellow card)	Stadium: Villa Park; Attendance: 26,474; Referee: Andy D'Urso

20 November 1999 14	Southampton	0–1	Tottenham Hotspur	Southampton
15:00 GMT	Lundekvam (yellow card) (yellow-red card) 89'; Colleter (yellow card); M. Hughes (yellow card); Pahars (yellow card); Richards (yellow card)	Report	Leonhardsen 81', (yellow card); Campbell (yellow card)	Stadium: The Dell; Attendance: 15,248; Referee: Steve Bennett

28 November 1999 15	Leeds United	1–0	Southampton	Leeds
15:00 GMT	Bridges 90'; Bakke (yellow card); Bowyer (yellow card)	Report	Colleter (yellow card) (yellow-red card) 86'; M. Hughes (yellow card); Kachloul (yellow card); Pahars (yellow card)	Stadium: Elland Road; Attendance: 39,288; Referee: Rob Harris

4 December 1999 16	Southampton	0–0	Coventry City	Southampton
15:00 GMT		Report	Chippo (yellow card); Whelan (yellow card)	Stadium: The Dell; Attendance: 15,168; Referee: Jeff Winter

18 December 1999 17	Sunderland	2–0	Southampton	Sunderland
15:00 GMT	Phillips 30', 90', (yellow card); Makin (yellow card)	Report	Beattie (yellow card); Benali (yellow card); Kachloul (yellow card); Le Tissier (yellow card); Lundekvam (yellow card)	Stadium: Stadium of Light; Attendance: 40,860; Referee: Mike Reed

26 December 1999 18	Southampton	1–2	Chelsea	Southampton
12:00 GMT	Davies 80'; Le Tissier (yellow card); Oakley (yellow card)	Report	Flo 18', 43'; Babayaro (yellow card); Deschamps (yellow card); Ferrer (yellow card); Leboeuf (yellow card)	Stadium: The Dell; Attendance: 15,232; Referee: Paul Alcock

28 December 1999 19	Watford	3–2	Southampton	Watford
15:00 GMT	Perpetuini 17', (yellow card); Gravelaine 31', 65', (yellow card); Hyde (yellow card); Robinson (yellow card); Smith (yellow card)	Report	Boa Morte 61'; Davies 63', (yellow card); M. Hughes (yellow card); Richards (yellow card)	Stadium: Vicarage Road; Attendance: 18,459; Referee: Mike Riley

3 January 2000 20	Southampton	1–0	Bradford City	Southampton
15:00 GMT	Davies 55'	Report		Stadium: The Dell; Attendance: 15,027; Referee: David Elleray

16 January 2000 21	Newcastle United	5–0	Southampton	Newcastle upon Tyne
16:00 GMT	Ferguson 3', 4'; Solano 17'; Dryden 31' (o.g.); Monk 83' (o.g.)	Report	M. Hughes (yellow card)	Stadium: St James' Park; Attendance: 35,623; Referee: Neale Barry

22 January 2000 22	Southampton	2–0	Everton	Southampton
15:00 GMT	Tessem 47'; Oakley 56'; Boa Morte (yellow card); Lundekvam (yellow card); Marsden (yellow card); Pahars (yellow card)	Report	Barmby (yellow card); Unsworth (yellow card); Weir (yellow card)	Stadium: The Dell; Attendance: 15,232; Referee: Andy D'Urso

5 February 2000 23	Southampton	2–1	West Ham United	Southampton
15:00 GMT	Pahars 54'; Charles 86' (o.g.)	Report	Lampard 65'; Charles (yellow card); Štimac (yellow card)	Stadium: The Dell; Attendance: 15,257; Referee: Barry Knight

12 February 2000 24	Sheffield Wednesday	0–1	Southampton	Sheffield
15:00 GMT		Report	Tessem 26'; Marsden (yellow card)	Stadium: Hillsborough Stadium; Attendance: 23,470; Referee: Alan Wiley

26 February 2000 25	Arsenal	3–1	Southampton	London
15:00 GMT	Ljungberg 22', 68'; Bergkamp 36', (yellow card); Vieira (yellow card)	Report	Richards 61'; Davies (yellow card); Dodd (yellow card); Kachloul (yellow card); Marsden (yellow card)	Stadium: Arsenal Stadium; Attendance: 38,044; Referee: Jeff Winter

4 March 2000 26	Southampton	1–1	Middlesbrough	Southampton
15:00 GMT	Pahars 44'	Report	Ricard 44' (pen.); Cooper (yellow card); Deane (yellow card); Summerbell (yellow card); Ziege (yellow card)	Stadium: The Dell; Attendance: 15,223; Referee: Steve Dunn

8 March 2000 27	West Ham United	2–0	Southampton	London
19:45 GMT	Wanchope 18'; Sinclair 48'	Report	Davies (yellow card)	Stadium: Boleyn Ground; Attendance: 23,484; Referee: Stephen Lodge

11 March 2000 28	Tottenham Hotspur	7–2	Southampton	London
15:00 GMT	Richards 28' (o.g.); Anderton 39'; Armstrong 41', 64'; Iversen 45', 78', 90'; Carr (yellow card); Freund (yellow card)	Report	Tessem 26'; El Khalej 33'; Benali (yellow card); Kachloul (yellow card)	Stadium: White Hart Lane; Attendance: 36,024; Referee: Mark Halsey

18 March 2000 29	Southampton	2–0	Aston Villa	Southampton
15:00 GMT	Davies 39', 63', (yellow card); El Khalej (yellow card); Kachloul (yellow card); Marsden (yellow card)	Report	Ehiogu (yellow card)	Stadium: The Dell; Attendance: 15,218; Referee: Mike Riley

25 March 2000 30	Chelsea	1–1	Southampton	London
15:00 GMT	Richards 75' (o.g.)	Report	Tessem 69'	Stadium: Stamford Bridge; Attendance: 34,956; Referee: Dermot Gallagher

1 April 2000 31	Southampton	1–2	Sunderland	Southampton
15:00 BST	Le Tissier 89' (pen.); Richards (yellow card)	Report	Quinn 14'; Phillips 86' (pen.); Roy (yellow card)	Stadium: The Dell; Attendance: 15,245; Referee: Paul Durkin

8 April 2000 32	Bradford City	1–2	Southampton	Bradford
15:00 BST	Blake 77'; Beagrie (yellow card); Halle (yellow card)	Report	Windass 56' (o.g.); Pahars 76'; El Khalej (yellow card); Ripley (yellow card)	Stadium: Valley Parade; Attendance: 17,439; Referee: David Elleray

15 April 2000 33	Southampton	2–0	Watford	Southampton
15:00 BST	Davies 4'; Pahars 75'	Report	Smart (yellow card)	Stadium: The Dell; Attendance: 15,252; Referee: Alan Wilkie

22 April 2000 34	Southampton	1–3	Manchester United	Southampton
15:00 BST	Pahars 83', (yellow card); Davies (yellow card)	Report	Beckham 7'; Benali 15' (o.g.); Solskjær 29'; Keane (yellow card)	Stadium: The Dell; Attendance: 15,245; Referee: Neale Barry

24 April 2000 35	Derby County	2–0	Southampton	Derby
13:00 BST	Powell 5'; Christie 42'; Burley (yellow card)	Report	Kachloul (yellow card); Marsden (yellow card)	Stadium: Pride Park Stadium; Attendance: 29,403; Referee: Peter Jones

29 April 2000 36	Southampton	1–2	Leicester City	Southampton
15:00 BST	Kachloul 4'; Richards (red card) 89'; Davies (yellow card); El Khalej (yellow card); Kachloul (yellow card); Marsden (yellow card)	Report	Cottee 22'; Izzet 60'; Walsh (yellow card)	Stadium: The Dell; Attendance: 15,178; Referee: Mike Reed

7 May 2000 37	Liverpool	0–0	Southampton	Liverpool
16:00 BST		Report	Dodd (yellow card)	Stadium: Anfield; Attendance: 44,015; Referee: Paul Alcock

14 May 2000 38	Southampton	2–0	Wimbledon	Southampton
16:00 BST	Bridge 57'; Pahars 79'	Report	Blackwell (yellow card); Euell (yellow card); Kimble (yellow card)	Stadium: The Dell; Attendance: 15,249; Referee: Stephen Lodge

=== Final league table ===
Pos	Team	Pld	W	D	L	GF	GA	GD	Pts	Qualification or relegation
13	Everton	38	12	14	12	59	49	+10	50	
14	Coventry City	38	12	8	18	47	54	−7	44	
15	Southampton	38	12	8	18	45	62	−17	44	
16	Derby County	38	9	11	18	44	57	−13	38	
17	Bradford City	38	9	9	20	38	68	−30	36	Qualification for the Intertoto Cup second round

Source: RSSSF
Rules for classification: 1) points; 2) goal difference; 3) number of goals scored.

=== Results by matchday ===
Round	1	2	3	4	5	6	7	8	9	10	11	12	13	14	15	16	17	18	19	20	21	22	23	24	25	26	27	28	29	30	31	32	33	34	35	36	37	38
Ground	A	H	H	A	H	A	H	A	H	A	H	A	A	H	A	H	A	H	A	H	A	H	H	A	A	H	A	A	H	A	H	A	H	H	A	H	A	H
Result	W	L	W	L	W	L	L	D	D	L	D	D	W	L	L	D	L	L	L	W	L	W	W	W	L	D	L	L	W	D	L	W	W	L	L	L	D	W
Position	5	14	6	10	9	13	13	13	13	14	14	14	14	14	16	16	16	16	16	16	17	17	16	14	16	15	15	16	15	15	15	15	15	15	15	15	15	15

Source: 11v11.com
A = Away; H = Home; W = Win; D = Draw; L = Loss

== FA Cup ==
Southampton entered the 1999–2000 FA Cup in the third round against First Division side Ipswich Town, who were tipped for – and ultimately achieved – promotion to the FA Premier League at the end of the season. Both sides had chances to open the scoring early on, but it was the visiting Saints who broke the deadlock just before half-time when Dean Richards headed in a free kick from Jo Tessem to put his side 1–0 up. After the break, Southampton continued to enjoy the majority of chances, with Richards coming close to doubling their lead on 65 minutes when he headed in from a corner, but hit the crossbar. Advancing to the fourth round, the Saints faced league rivals Aston Villa, who had knocked them out of the League Cup with a 4–0 thrashing just over a month before. In a game described by club historians as a "dismal afternoon", the Saints struggled to gain any momentum in the tie and conceded the only goal of the game after 20 minutes, when centre-back Gareth Southgate headed in a Paul Merson free kick.

13 December 1999 Round 3	Ipswich Town	0–1	Southampton	Ipswich
			M. Hughes (yellow card) 11'; Richards 40'	Stadium: Portman Road; Attendance: 14,383; Referee: Graham Barber

8 January 2000 Round 4	Aston Villa	1–0	Southampton	Birmingham
	Southgate 20'; Carbone (yellow card)		Davies (yellow card); Kachloul (yellow card); Lundekvam (yellow card)	Stadium: Villa Park; Attendance: 25,025; Referee: Neale Barry

== League Cup ==
Southampton entered the 1999–2000 League Cup in the second round, drawn against Manchester City, who were on their way to automatic promotion back to the FA Premier League as First Division runners-up. After a goalless first leg at Maine Road, the Saints edged through the return leg 4–3 after extra time. After Paul Dickov put City 1–0 up within ten minutes, Jason Dodd equalised five minutes later from the penalty spot following a foul on Trond Egil Soltvedt. Either side of the half-time break, Matt Oakley made it 2–1 and then 3–1, before a late brace from Shaun Goater forced an extra 30 minutes. Just after the restart, Dean Richards scored from a Matt Le Tissier corner to send the hosts through. In the third round, Southampton hosted Liverpool, beating the Reds 2–1 thanks to a last-minute winner from Soltvedt after second-half goals from Michael Owen and Richards. Another FA Premier League side, Aston Villa, hosted the Saints in the fourth round, less than a month after the South Coast side had beaten them 1–0 at Villa Park in the league. Fortunes were dramatically reversed in the cup, however, as Villa won 4–0 thanks to goals from Steve Watson, Julian Joachim and Dion Dublin (two).

15 September 1999 Round 2 Leg 1	Manchester City	0–0	Southampton	Manchester
	Weaver (yellow card)			Stadium: Maine Road; Attendance: 17,476; Referee: Kevin Lynch

21 September 1999 Round 2 Leg 2	Southampton	4–3 (a.e.t.) (4–3 agg.)	Manchester City	Southampton
	Dodd 16' (pen.), (yellow card); Oakley 28', 57', (yellow card); Richards 92'; M. Hughes (yellow card) (yellow-red card) 89'; Lundekvam (yellow card)		Dickov 10'; Goater 76', 82'; Bishop (yellow card); Jobson (yellow card); Tiatto (yellow card)	Stadium: The Dell; Attendance: 10,960; Referee: Rob Harris

13 October 1999 Round 3	Southampton	2–1	Liverpool	Southampton
	Richards 67'; Soltvedt 90'		Owen 53'; Henchoz (yellow card)	Stadium: The Dell; Attendance: 13,822; Referee: Dermot Gallagher

1 December 1999 Round 4	Aston Villa	4–0	Southampton	Birmingham
	Watson 22'; Joachim 66', (yellow card); Dublin 72', 90'; Boateng (yellow card)		Oakley (yellow card)	Stadium: Villa Park; Attendance: 17,608; Referee: Barry Knight

== Player details ==
Southampton used 29 players during the 1999–2000 season, 15 of whom scored during the campaign. Seven players made their debut appearances for the club, including six of their ten first team signings (Marco Almeida, Luís Boa Morte, Tahar El Khalej, Dean Richards, Trond Egil Soltvedt, and Jo Tessem) and one signing from the previous season (Dani Rodrigues). Three of these – Almeida, Boa Morte, and Rodrigues – also made their last appearances for the Saints during the campaign, as did mid-season departees Scott Hiley, Mark Hughes, Egil Østenstad, plus three players sold the following season (Shayne Bradley, Richard Dryden, and Patrick Colleter), and one forced to retire the next season (John Beresford). New centre-back Richards made the most appearances for Southampton during the season, playing in 40 of the side's 44 games across all three competitions. Marians Pahars, who made the second-most appearances on 38 in all competitions, finished as the club's top goalscorer in his first full season at the club, with 13 goals in the league. Richards won the Southampton F.C. Player of the Season award for the 1999–2000 season.

=== Squad statistics ===
No.	Name	Pos.	Nat.	League		FA Cup		League Cup		Total		Discipline	
No.	Name	Pos.	Nat.	Apps.	Goals	Apps.	Goals	Apps.	Goals	Apps.	Goals	Yellow card	Red card
1	Paul Jones	GK	(Wales)	31	0	2	0	4	0	37	0	0	0
2	Jason Dodd	DF	(England)	30(1)	0	2	0	3(1)	1	35(2)	1	6	0
3	John Beresford	DF	(England)	0(3)	0	0	0	0	0	0(3)	0	0	0
4	Chris Marsden	MF	(England)	19(2)	0	1	0	0(2)	0	20(3)	0	6	0
5	Claus Lundekvam	DF	(Norway)	25(2)	0	2	0	4	0	31(2)	0	5	1
6	Dean Richards	DF	(England)	35	2	1	1	4	2	40	5	4	1
7	Matt Le Tissier	MF	(England)	9(9)	3	0	0	1(2)	0	10(11)	3	3	0
8	Matt Oakley	MF	(England)	26(5)	3	1	0	4	2	31(5)	5	5	0
10	Kevin Davies	FW	(England)	19(4)	6	1	0	0(1)	0	20(5)	6	8	1
11	David Howells	MF	(England)	0	0	0	0	0	0	0	0	0	0
13	Neil Moss	GK	(England)	7(2)	0	0	0	0	0	7(2)	0	0	0
14	Stuart Ripley	MF	(England)	18(5)	1	2	0	2	0	22(5)	1	1	0
15	Francis Benali	DF	(England)	25(1)	0	1	0	3	0	29(1)	0	4	0
16	James Beattie	FW	(England)	8(10)	0	0(1)	0	1(2)	0	9(13)	0	2	0
17	Marians Pahars	FW	(Latvia)	31(2)	13	2	0	3	0	36(2)	13	4	0
18	Wayne Bridge	DF	(England)	15(4)	1	2	0	2	0	19(4)	1	0	0
19	Dani Rodrigues	MF	(Portugal)	0(2)	0	0	0	0	0	0(2)	0	0	0
20	Scott Bevan	GK	(England)	0	0	0	0	0	0	0	0	0	0
21	Jo Tessem	MF	(Norway)	23(2)	4	2	0	1	0	26(2)	4	0	0
22	David Hughes	MF	(England)	0	0	0	0	0	0	0	0	0	0
24	Patrick Colleter	DF	(France)	8	0	0	0	1	0	9	0	2	1
25	Garry Monk	DF	(England)	1(1)	0	0	0	0	0	1(1)	0	0	0
26	Imants Bleidelis	MF	(Latvia)	0	0	0	0	0	0	0	0	0	0
27	Tahar El Khalej	DF	(Morocco)	11	1	0	0	0	0	11	1	3	0
28	Kevin Gibbens	MF	(England)	0	0	0	0	0	0	0	0	0	0
29	Marco Almeida	DF	(Portugal)	0(1)	0	0	0	0	0	0(1)	0	0	0
30	Hassan Kachloul	MF	(Morocco)	29(3)	5	0(1)	0	4	0	33(4)	5	10	0
31	Shayne Bradley	FW	(England)	0(1)	0	0	0	0	0	0(1)	0	1	0
32	Trond Egil Soltvedt	MF	(Norway)	17(7)	1	1(1)	0	4	1	22(8)	2	0	0
33	Adam Sims	MF	(England)	0	0	0	0	0	0	0	0	0	0
34	Bruno Leal	DF	(Portugal)	0	0	0	0	0	0	0	0	0	0
35	Luís Boa Morte	MF	(Portugal)	6(8)	1	1	0	0(2)	0	7(10)	1	1	1
37	Phil Warner	DF	(England)	0	0	0	0	0	0	0	0	0	0
—	Paul Hughes	MF	(England)	0	0	0	0	0	0	0	0	0	0
Squad members who left before the end of the season
9	Mark Hughes	FW	(Wales)	18(2)	1	1(1)	0	3	0	22(3)	1	9	1
10	Egil Østenstad	FW	(Norway)	3	1	0	0	0	0	3	1	2	0
21	Andy Williams	MF	(Wales)	0	0	0	0	0	0	0	0	0	0
23	Scott Hiley	DF	(England)	3	0	0	0	0	0	3	0	0	0
26	Scott Marshall	DF	(Scotland)	0	0	0	0	0	0	0	0	0	0
Squad members who ended the season out on loan
12	Richard Dryden	DF	(England)	1	0	0	0	0	0	1	0	0	0

=== Most appearances ===
Rank	Name	Pos.	League		FA Cup		League Cup		Total		
Rank	Name	Pos.	Starts	Subs	Starts	Subs	Starts	Subs	Starts	Subs	Total
1	Dean Richards	DF	35	0	1	0	4	0	40	0	40
2	Marians Pahars	FW	31	2	2	0	3	0	36	2	38
3	Paul Jones	GK	31	0	2	0	4	0	37	0	37
3	Jason Dodd	DF	30	1	2	0	3	1	35	2	37
3	Hassan Kachloul	MF	29	3	0	1	4	0	33	4	37
6	Matt Oakley	MF	26	5	1	0	4	0	31	5	36
7	Claus Lundekvam	DF	25	2	2	0	4	0	31	2	33
8	Trond Egil Soltvedt	MF	17	7	1	1	4	0	22	8	31
9	Francis Benali	DF	25	1	1	0	3	0	29	1	30
10	Jo Tessem	MF	23	2	2	0	1	0	26	2	28

=== Top goalscorers ===
Rank	Name	Pos.	League		FA Cup		League Cup		Total		
Rank	Name	Pos.	Goals	Apps	Goals	Apps	Goals	Apps	Goals	Apps	GPG
1	Marians Pahars	FW	13	33	0	2	0	3	13	38	0.34
2	Kevin Davies	FW	6	23	0	1	0	1	6	25	0.24
3	Matt Oakley	MF	3	31	0	1	2	4	5	36	0.14
3	Hassan Kachloul	MF	5	32	0	1	0	4	5	37	0.14
3	Dean Richards	DF	2	35	1	1	2	4	5	40	0.13
6	Jo Tessem	MF	4	25	0	2	0	1	4	28	0.14
7	Matt Le Tissier	MF	3	18	0	0	0	3	3	21	0.14
8	Trond Egil Soltvedt	MF	1	24	0	2	1	4	2	30	0.07
9	Egil Østenstad	FW	1	3	0	0	0	0	1	3	0.33
9	Tahar El Khalej	DF	1	11	0	0	0	0	1	11	0.09
9	Luís Boa Morte	MF	1	14	0	1	0	2	1	17	0.06
9	Wayne Bridge	DF	1	19	0	2	0	2	1	23	0.04
9	Mark Hughes	FW	1	20	0	2	0	3	1	25	0.04
9	Stuart Ripley	MF	1	23	0	2	0	2	1	27	0.04
9	Jason Dodd	DF	0	31	0	2	1	4	1	37	0.03

== Bibliography ==
- Holley, Duncan; Chalk, Gary (2003), Bull, David (ed.), In That Number: A Post-War Chronicle of Southampton FC, Bristol, England: Hagiology Publishing, ISBN 0-9534474-3-X
