= 2001–02 Tottenham Hotspur F.C. season =

English football club season

Tottenham Hotspur
2001–02 season
- Owner: ENIC Group
- Chairman: Daniel Levy
- Manager: Glenn Hoddle
- Stadium: White Hart Lane
- Premiership: 9th
- FA Cup: Sixth round
- League Cup: Runners-up
- Top goalscorer: League: Teddy Sheringham; Gustavo Poyet (10); All: Les Ferdinand (15)
- Highest home attendance: All: 36,100 v Chelsea, League Cup, 23 January 2002; League: 36,083 v West Ham United, 13 April 2002
- Lowest home attendance: All: 20,347 v Torquay United, League Cup, 13 September 2001; League: 29,602 v Charlton Athletic, 18 March 2002
- Average home league attendance: 35,001
Home colours	Away colours	Third colours

The 2001–02 season was Tottenham Hotspur's 10th season in the FA Premier League and 24th successive season in the top division of the English football league system. The club also participated in the FA Cup and the Football League Cup.

== Season summary ==
Glenn Hoddle's return to White Hart Lane as manager was seen by many as the revival of Tottenham after many seasons of mediocrity. Spurs reached the Worthington Cup final with Spurs fans hopeful that Hoddle's comeback would result in instant success. However Blackburn Rovers won 2–1, and Tottenham's silverware bid was over. Unremarkable Premiership form ended their UEFA Cup hopes, and they had to settle for ninth place in the final table.

== Squad ==
Squad at end of season

Note: Flags indicate national team as defined under FIFA eligibility rules; some limited exceptions apply. Players may hold more than one non-FIFA nationality.

No.	Pos.	Nation	Player
1	GK	SCO	Neil Sullivan
2	DF	IRL	Stephen Carr
3	DF	ARG	Mauricio Taricco
4	MF	GER	Steffen Freund
5	DF	YUG	Goran Bunjevčević
6	DF	ENG	Chris Perry
7	MF	ENG	Darren Anderton
8	MF	ENG	Tim Sherwood (Vice-captain)
9	FW	ENG	Les Ferdinand (3rd captain)
10	FW	ENG	Teddy Sheringham (captain)
11	FW	UKR	Serhii Rebrov
12	DF	IRL	Gary Doherty
13	GK	USA	Kasey Keller
14	MF	URU	Gustavo Poyet
16	FW	NOR	Steffen Iversen
17	MF	NOR	Øyvind Leonhardsen
18	DF	ENG	Ben Thatcher

No.	Pos.	Nation	Player
19	FW	ENG	Chris Armstrong
20	MF	ENG	Johnnie Jackson
23	MF	GER	Christian Ziege
24	GK	CAN	Lars Hirschfeld
25	MF	ENG	Stephen Clemence
26	DF	ENG	Ledley King
27	FW	SCO	Steven Ferguson
28	MF	ENG	Matthew Etherington
29	MF	WAL	Simon Davies
30	DF	ENG	Anthony Gardner
31	DF	ENG	Alton Thelwell
32	GK	ENG	Gavin Kelly
33	MF	NIR	Ciaran Toner
34	FW	ENG	John Piercy
36	DF	ENG	Dean Richards
37	FW	FRA	Yannick Kamanan

== Transfers ==
=== Transfers in ===
Date from	Position	Nationality	Name	From	Fee	Ref.
26 May 2001	ST	(England)	Teddy Sheringham	(England) Manchester United	Free	
Summer 2001	MID	(Germany)	Christian Ziege	(England) Liverpool	Undisclosed	
Summer 2001	MID	(Uruguay)	Gus Poyet	(England) Chelsea	Free	
Summer 2001	DEF	(Federal Republic of Yugoslavia)	Goran Bunjevčević	(Federal Republic of Yugoslavia) Red Star Belgrade	Undisclosed	
21 September 2001	DEF	(England)	Dean Richards	(England) Southampton	£8.1 million	

=== Loans in ===
Date from	Position	Nationality	Name	From	Date until	Ref.
16 November 2001	GK	(England)	Dave Beasant	(England) Portsmouth	31 January 2002	

=== Released ===
Date from	Position	Nationality	Name	To	Notes	Ref.
3 October 2001	MF	(Netherlands)	Willem Korsten	Free agent	Retired	
2001	GK	(Netherlands)	Hans Segers	Free agent	Released	

=== Transfers out ===
Date from	Position	Nationality	Name	To	Fee	Ref.
3 July 2001	DF	(England)	Sol Campbell	(England) Arsenal	Free	
Summer 2001	GK	(England)	Ian Walker	(England) Leicester	Free	
7 November 2001	DF	(England)	Ian Hillier	(England) Luton Town	Undisclosed	

== Competitions ==
=== Overview ===
Competition	First match	Last match	Starting round	Final position	Record							
Competition	First match	Last match	Starting round	Final position	Pld	W	D	L	GF	GA	GD	Win %
Premier League	18 August 2001	11 May 2002	Matchday 1	9th	38	14	8	16	49	53	−4	36.84
FA Cup	16 January 2002	10 March 2002	Third round	Quarter-Final	4	3	0	1	10	4	+6	75.00
League Cup	13 September 2001	24 February 2002	Second round	Runners-up	7	5	0	2	21	6	+15	71.43
Total					49	22	8	19	80	63	+17	44.90

Source: Competitions

=== Premier League ===
==== League Table ====
Pos	Team	Pld	W	D	L	GF	GA	GD	Pts	Qualification or relegation
7	West Ham United	38	15	8	15	48	57	−9	53	
8	Aston Villa	38	12	14	12	46	47	−1	50	Qualification for the Intertoto Cup third round
9	Tottenham Hotspur	38	14	8	16	49	53	−4	50	
10	Blackburn Rovers	38	12	10	16	55	51	+4	46	Qualification for the UEFA Cup first round (Note: Blackburn Rovers qualified for the UEFA Cup as League Cup winners.)
11	Southampton	38	12	9	17	46	54	−8	45	

Source: Premier League
Rules for classification: 1) points; 2) goal difference; 3) number of goals scored.

==== Results summary ====
Overall								Home						Away					
Pld	W	D	L	GF	GA	GD	Pts	W	D	L	GF	GA	GD	W	D	L	GF	GA	GD
38	14	8	16	49	53	−4	50	10	4	5	32	24	+8	4	4	11	17	29	−12

Source: Statto

==== Results by round ====
Matchday	1	2	3	4	5	6	7	8	9	10	11	12	13	14	15	16	17	18	19	20	21	22	23	24	25	26	27	28	29	30	31	32	33	34	35	36	37	38
Ground	H	A	A	H	H	A	A	H	H	A	H	A	H	A	H	A	H	H	A	A	H	A	H	H	A	H	H	A	A	H	A	A	H	A	H	A	H	A
Result	D	D	L	W	L	W	L	L	W	W	W	L	D	W	W	L	W	L	L	D	W	L	D	L	L	W	W	L	L	L	W	D	W	L	D	D	W	L
Position	8	9	14	11	11	7	10	13	12	9	7	9	9	6	5	6	6	7	7	7	7	8	7	8	8	8	8	8	9	9	9	8	7	8	8	8	7	9

A = Away; H = Home; W = Win; D = Draw; L = Loss

==== Results ====
18 August 2001 1	Tottenham Hotspur	0–0	Aston Villa	Tottenham
15:00 BST	Clemence (yellow card) 5'; Doherty (yellow card) 42'; Ziege (yellow card) 49'	Report	Boateng (yellow card) 36'; Delaney (yellow card) 48'	Stadium: White Hart Lane; Attendance: 36,059; Referee: Dermot Gallagher

20 August 2001 2	Everton	1–1	Tottenham Hotspur	Walton
20:00 BST	Ferguson 65' (pen.), (yellow card); Pistone (yellow card); Weir (yellow card)	Report	Anderton 45'; Doherty (red card) 63'; Poyet (red card) 66'; Ziege (yellow card) 89'; Sheringham (yellow card) 89'	Stadium: Goodison Park; Attendance: 29,503; Referee: Neale Barry

25 August 2001 3	Blackburn Rovers	2–1	Tottenham Hotspur	Blackburn
15:00 BST	Mahon 7'; Gillespie (yellow card) 68'; Duff 71'	Report	Taricco (yellow card) 66'; Ziege 90'	Stadium: Ewood Park; Attendance: 24,992; Referee: Steve Bennett

9 September 2001 4	Tottenham Hotspur	2–0	Southampton	Tottenham
14:00 BST	Ziege 76'; Davies 87'	Report		Stadium: White Hart Lane; Attendance: 33,668; Referee: Alan Wiley

16 September 2001 5	Tottenham Hotspur	2–3	Chelsea	Tottenham
14:00 BST	Sheringham 66', 89'; Ferdinand (yellow card) 80'; Freund (yellow card) 82'	Report	Hasselbaink 45', 81' (pen.); Desailly 90' (yellow card); Lampard (yellow card) (yellow-red card); Le Saux (yellow card); Grønkjær (yellow card)	Stadium: White Hart Lane; Attendance: 36,037; Referee: Steve Dunn

19 September 2001 6	Sunderland	1–2	Tottenham Hotspur	Sunderland
20:00 BST	Phillips 79'; Schwarz (yellow card)	Report	Ziege 26', (yellow card); Sheringham 51'; Perry (yellow card)	Stadium: Stadium of Light; Attendance: 47,310; Referee: Paul Durkin

22 September 2001 7	Liverpool	1–0	Tottenham Hotspur	Liverpool
15:00 BST	Litmanen 57'; Vignal (yellow card)	Report	Freund (yellow card)	Stadium: Anfield; Attendance: 44,116; Referee: Dermot Gallagher

29 September 2001 8	Tottenham Hotspur	3–5	Manchester United	Tottenham
15:00 BST	Richards 15'; Ferdinand 25'; Ziege 45'; Freund (yellow card); Perry (yellow card); Poyet (yellow card)	Report	Cole 46'; Blanc 58'; Van Nistlerooy 72'; Verón 76'; Beckham 87', (yellow card); Butt (yellow card); Irwin (yellow card)	Stadium: White Hart Lane; Attendance: 36,038; Referee: Jeff Winter

15 October 2001 9	Tottenham Hotspur	3–1	Derby County	Tottenham
20:00 BST	Ferdinand 10'; Ziege 41'; Poyet 90'	Report	Ravanelli 15', (yellow card); Mawéné (yellow card)	Stadium: White Hart Lane; Attendance: 30,148; Referee: Mark Halsey

21 October 2001 10	Newcastle United	0–2	Tottenham Hotspur	Newcastle
14:00 BST	Bellamy (yellow card); Dabizas (yellow card)	Report	Speed 8' (o.g.); Poyet 20'; Freund (yellow card) 72'	Stadium: St James' Park; Attendance: 50,593; Referee: Alan Wiley

27 October 2001 11	Tottenham Hotspur	2–1	Middlesbrough	Tottenham
15:00 BST	Sheringham 58' (pen.); Ferdinand 61'	Report	Bokšić 9'	Stadium: White Hart Lane; Attendance: 36,062; Referee: Mike Dean

4 November 2001 12	Leeds United	2–1	Tottenham Hotspur	Leeds
12:00 GMT	Johnson (yellow card) 50'; Harte 61'; Kewell 82'	Report	Poyet (yellow card) 15', (goal) 52'; Sheringham (yellow card) 43'; Ziege (yellow card) 45'	Stadium: Elland Road; Attendance: 40,203; Referee: Steve Bennett

17 November 2001 13	Tottenham Hotspur	1–1	Arsenal	Tottenham
15:00 GMT	Ferdinand (yellow card) 69'; Sheringham (yellow card) 84'; Poyet 90'	Report	Pires 81'; Keown (yellow card)	Stadium: White Hart Lane; Attendance: 36,049; Referee: Jeff Winter

24 November 2001 14	West Ham United	0–1	Tottenham Hotspur	Upton Park
15:00 GMT	Moncur (yellow card) 36'; Cole (yellow card)	Report	Ferdinand 50'; Freund (yellow card) 82'; Perry (yellow card) 90'	Stadium: Upton Park; Attendance: 32,780; Referee: David Elleray

3 December 2001 15	Tottenham Hotspur	3–2	Bolton Wanderers	Tottenham
20:00 GMT	Poyet 47'; Ferdinand 48'; Sheringham 86'	Report	Ricketts 8', (yellow card) 73'; Wallace 56'; Nolan (yellow card)	Stadium: White Hart Lane; Attendance: 32,971; Referee: Paul Durkin

8 December 2001 16	Charlton Athletic	3–1	Tottenham Hotspur	Charlton
15:00 GMT	Stuart 4'; Lisbie 19', 78', (yellow card); Kiely (yellow card); Young (yellow card)	Report	Taricco (yellow card) 72'; Poyet 85'	Stadium: The Valley; Attendance: 25,125; Referee: Steve Dunn

15 December 2001 17	Tottenham Hotspur	4–0	Fulham	Tottenham
15:00 GMT	Ferdinand 20', (yellow card) 62'; Anderton 40'; Perry (yellow card) 45'; Freund (yellow card) 65'; Davies 71'; Rebrov 77'	Report	Boa Morte (yellow card); Saha (yellow card)	Stadium: White Hart Lane; Attendance: 36,054; Referee: Neale Barry

22 December 2001 18	Tottenham Hotspur	1–2	Ipswich Town	Tottenham
15:00 GMT	Davies 12'; Sheringham (red card) 54'; Anderton (yellow card) 58'	Report	George 40'; McGreal (yellow card) 83'; Armstrong 88'; Reuser (yellow card)	Stadium: White Hart Lane; Attendance: 36,040; Referee: Mike Riley

26 December 2001 19	Southampton	1–0	Tottenham Hotspur	Southampton
12:00 GMT	Beattie 56'	Report	Gardner (yellow card) 3'; Richards (yellow card) 87'; Taricco (yellow card) 90'	Stadium: St Mary's Stadium; Attendance: 31,719; Referee: Peter Jones

29 December 2001 20	Aston Villa	1–1	Tottenham Hotspur	Birmingham
15:00 GMT	Ángel 90' (pen.)	Report	Ferdinand 38', (yellow card) 81'; Ziege (yellow card) 83'; Richards (yellow card) 89'	Stadium: Villa Park; Attendance: 41,134; Referee: Eddie Wolstenholme

1 January 2002 21	Tottenham Hotspur	1–0	Blackburn Rovers	Tottenham
15:00 GMT	Richards 45'	Report	Neill (yellow card); Tugay (yellow card)	Stadium: White Hart Lane; Attendance: 35,131; Referee: Jeff Winter

12 January 2002 22	Ipswich Town	2–1	Tottenham Hotspur	Ipswich
15:00 GMT	Bent 12'; McGreal 81'	Report	Poyet 58', (yellow card) 84'	Stadium: Portman Road; Attendance: 25,077; Referee: Matt Messias

19 January 2002 23	Tottenham Hotspur	1–1	Everton	Tottenham
15:00 GMT	Ferdinand 5'	Report	Weir 8', (yellow card); Ferguson (yellow card)	Stadium: White Hart Lane; Attendance: 36,056; Referee: Clive Wilkes

30 January 2002 24	Tottenham Hotspur	1–3	Newcastle United	Tottenham
19:45 GMT	Iversen 17'; Richards (yellow card) 39'	Report	Acuña 67'; Shearer 69'; Bellamy 78'; Distin (yellow card)	Stadium: White Hart Lane; Attendance: 35,798; Referee: Mike Dean

2 February 2002 25	Derby County	1–0	Tottenham Hotspur	Derby
12:00 GMT	Morris 43'; Christie (yellow card); Powell (yellow card); Ravanelli (yellow card)	Report	Sherwood (yellow card) 6'; Taricco (yellow card) 17'	Stadium: Pride Park Stadium; Attendance: 27,721; Referee: Uriah Rennie

9 February 2002 26	Tottenham Hotspur	2–1	Leicester City	Tottenham
15:00 GMT	Anderton 37'; Davies 61'	Report	Oakes 79'; Impey (yellow card)	Stadium: White Hart Lane; Attendance: 35,973; Referee: Andy D'Urso

2 March 2002 27	Tottenham Hotspur	2–1	Sunderland	Tottenham
15:00 GMT	Poyet 31'; Ferdinand 63'	Report	Mboma 45'; McAteer (yellow card)	Stadium: White Hart Lane; Attendance: 36,062; Referee: Rob Styles

6 March 2002 28	Manchester United	4–0	Tottenham Hotspur	Trafford
20:00 GMT	Beckham 15', 64'; Van Nistlerooy 63' (pen.), 76'; Scholes (yellow card) 70'; Keane (yellow card)	Report	Taricco (red card) 42'; Poyet (yellow card) 43'; Sherwood (yellow card) 66'; Ziege (yellow card) 71'	Stadium: Old Trafford; Attendance: 67,059; Referee: Mike Riley

13 March 2002 29	Chelsea	4–0	Tottenham Hotspur	Fulham
19:45 GMT	Hasselbaink 24', 69', 81'; Lampard 90'	Report	Sherwood (yellow card) 40'; Thatcher (yellow card) 49'; Perry (yellow card) 55'; Taricco (red card) 60'	Stadium: Stamford Bridge; Attendance: 39,652; Referee: Alan Wiley

18 March 2002 30	Tottenham Hotspur	0–1	Charlton Athletic	Tottenham
20:00 GMT	Gardner (yellow card) 35'	Report	Powell 70'	Stadium: White Hart Lane; Attendance: 29,602; Referee: Jeff Winter

24 March 2002 31	Fulham	0–2	Tottenham Hotspur	Fulham
16:00 GMT	Goma (yellow card); Malbranque (yellow card)	Report	Gardner (yellow card) 22'; Sheringham 28'; Poyet 32'; Sherwood (yellow card) 58'	Stadium: Craven Cottage; Attendance: 15,885; Referee: Paul Durkin

30 March 2002 32	Middlesbrough	1–1	Tottenham Hotspur	Middlesbrough
17:35 GMT	Queudrue 69'	Report	Poyet (yellow card) 9'; Iversen 32'; Thatcher (yellow card) 74'; Perry (yellow card) 83'	Stadium: Riverside Stadium; Attendance: 31,258; Referee: Phil Dowd

1 April 2002 33	Tottenham Hotspur	2–1	Leeds United	Tottenham
15:00 BST	Iversen 10'; Sheringham 29'; Etherington (yellow card) 34'; Thatcher (yellow card) 38'	Report	Viduka 52'	Stadium: White Hart Lane; Attendance: 35,167; Referee: Uriah Rennie

6 April 2002 34	Arsenal	2–1	Tottenham Hotspur	Holloway
15:00 BST	Ljungberg 24'; Bergkamp (yellow card) 72'; Lauren 86' (pen.)	Report	Poyet (yellow card) 14'; Sheringham (yellow card) 26', (goal) 81'; Sherwood (yellow card) 37'; Perry (yellow card) 71'	Stadium: Highbury; Attendance: 38,186; Referee: Mark Halsey

13 April 2002 35	Tottenham Hotspur	1–1	West Ham United	Tottenham
15:00 BST	Sheringham 53'	Report	Pearce 89'	Stadium: White Hart Lane; Attendance: 36,083; Referee: Neale Barry

20 April 2002 36	Bolton Wanderers	1–1	Tottenham Hotspur	Bolton
15:00 BST	Holdsworth 71'; Whitlow (yellow card)	Report	Iversen 8', (yellow card) 45'; Perry (yellow card) 62'; Gardner (yellow card) 88'	Stadium: Reebok Stadium; Attendance: 25,817; Referee: Matt Messias

27 April 2002 37	Tottenham Hotspur	1–0	Liverpool	Tottenham
12:00 BST	Poyet 41'	Report	Riise (yellow card)	Stadium: White Hart Lane; Attendance: 36,017; Referee: Peter Jones

11 May 2002 38	Leicester City	2–1	Tottenham Hotspur	Leicester
15:00 BST	Dickov 60'; Piper 71'	Report	Sheringham 54' (pen.)	Stadium: Filbert Street; Attendance: 21,716; Referee: David Elleray

=== FA Cup ===
16 January 2002 Third round	Coventry City	0–2	Tottenham Hotspur	Coventry
19:45 GMT	Shaw (yellow card) 34'; Konjić (yellow card) 47'; Breen (yellow card) 51'	Report	Poyet 23'; Sherwood (yellow card) 45'; Ferdinand 52'	Stadium: Highfield Road; Attendance: 20,758; Referee: Neale Barry
Note: Originally scheduled for January 4; postponed due to a frozen pitch.

5 February 2002 Fourth round	Tottenham Hotspur	4–0	Bolton Wanderers	Tottenham
19:45 GMT	Anderton 22' (pen.); Iversen 35'; Etherington 56'; Barness 73' (o.g.)	Report	Whitlow (yellow card) 23'; Nolan (yellow card) 59'	Stadium: White Hart Lane; Attendance: 27,093; Referee: Steve Dunn

17 February 2002 Fifth round	Tottenham Hotspur	4–0	Tranmere Rovers	Tottenham
16:00 GMT	Ziege 9'; Poyet 36', 90'; Sheringham 64'	Report	Sharps (yellow card) 41'	Stadium: White Hart Lane; Attendance: 30,696; Referee: David Elleray

10 March 2002 Quarter-finals	Tottenham Hotspur	0–4	Chelsea	Tottenham
16:00 GMT	Ferdinand (yellow card) 5'; Richards (yellow card) 8'; Ziege (yellow card) 15'; Sheringham (yellow card) 56'; Sherwood (yellow card) 58'	Report	Gallas 12'; Guðjohnsen 48', 60'; Le Saux 54', (yellow card) (yellow-red card) 77'; Desailly (yellow card) 56'; Lampard (yellow card) 90'	Stadium: White Hart Lane; Attendance: 32,896; Referee: Andy D'Urso

=== League Cup ===
13 September 2001 Second round	Tottenham Hotspur	2–0	Torquay United	Tottenham
19:45 BST	King (yellow card) 57', (goal) 61'; Ferdinand 69'	Report	Williams (yellow card) 10'; McNeil (yellow card) 19'; Brandon (yellow card) 61'	Stadium: White Hart Lane; Attendance: 20,347; Referee: Mark Warren

9 October 2001 Third round	Tranmere Rovers	0–4	Tottenham Hotspur	Birkenhead
	Henry (yellow card) 27'; Mellon (yellow card) (yellow-red card) 33'; Sharps (yellow card) 36'	Report	Poyet (yellow card) 17', (goal) 49'; Sheringham 21' (pen.); Anderton 39', (yellow card) 90'; Sherwood (yellow card) 72' (yellow-red card) 87'; Rebrov (yellow card) 81'	Stadium: Prenton Park; Attendance: 12,386; Referee: Phil Dowd

29 November 2001 Fourth round	Fulham	1–2	Tottenham Hotspur	Fulham
19:45 GMT	Hayles 45'	Report	Rebrov 15'; Bunjevčević (yellow card) 75'; Davies 86'; Ziege (yellow card) 89'	Stadium: Craven Cottage; Attendance: 17,006; Referee: Mark Halsey

11 December 2001 Fifth round	Tottenham Hotspur	6–0	Bolton Wanderers	Tottenham
19:45 GMT	Davies 21'; Ferdinand 29', 30', 38'; Barness 79' (o.g.); Iversen 84'	Report	Jääskeläinen (yellow card) 45'	Stadium: White Hart Lane; Attendance: 28,430; Referee: Graham Barber

9 January 2002 Semi-final first leg	Chelsea	2–1	Tottenham Hotspur	Fulham
20:05 GMT	Hasselbaink 10', 77'	Report	Ferdinand 65'; Anderton (yellow card) 78'	Stadium: Stamford Bridge; Attendance: 37,264; Referee: Alan Wiley

23 January 2002 Semi-final second leg	Tottenham Hotspur	5–1 (6–3 agg.)	Chelsea	Tottenham
20:05 GMT	Iversen 2'; Sherwood 33'; Poyet (yellow card) 48'; Sheringham 50', (yellow card) 57'; Davies 76'; Rebrov 87'	Report	Hasselbaink (red card) 55'; Melchiot (yellow card) 59'; Forssell 90'	Stadium: White Hart Lane; Attendance: 36,100; Referee: Mark Halsey

24 February 2002 Final	Blackburn Rovers	2–1	Tottenham Hotspur	Cardiff
15:00 GMT	Jansen 25'; Cole 69'	Report	Sherwood (yellow card) 28'; Ziege 33'; Taricco (yellow card) 78'; Ziege (yellow card) 80'	Stadium: Millennium Stadium; Attendance: 72,500; Referee: Graham Poll

== Statistics ==
=== Appearances ===
No.	Pos	Nat	Player	Total		Premier League		FA Cup		League Cup	
No.	Pos	Nat	Player	Apps	Goals	Apps	Goals	Apps	Goals	Apps	Goals
Goalkeepers
1	GK	(Scotland) SCO	Neil Sullivan	38	0	29	0	4	0	5	0
13	GK	(United States) USA	Kasey Keller	11	0	9	0	0	0	2	0
Defenders
3	DF	(Argentina) ARG	Mauricio Taricco	40	0	30	0	3+1	0	6	0
5	DF	(Federal Republic of Yugoslavia) YUG	Goran Bunjevcevic	8	0	5+1	0	0	0	1+1	0
6	DF	(England) ENG	Chris Perry	42	0	30+3	0	2	0	7	0
12	DF	(Republic of Ireland) IRL	Gary Doherty	8	0	4+3	0	0	0	1	0
18	DF	(England) ENG	Ben Thatcher	17	0	11+1	0	2	0	2+1	0
26	DF	(England) ENG	Ledley King	42	1	32	0	3	0	7	1
30	DF	(England) ENG	Anthony Gardner	19	0	11+4	0	1	0	3	0
31	DF	(England) ENG	Alton Thelwell	3	0	0+2	0	0+1	0	0	0
36	DF	(England) ENG	Dean Richards	28	2	24	2	4	0	0	0
Midfielders
4	MF	(Germany) GER	Steffen Freund	25	0	19+1	0	0	0	5	0
7	MF	(England) ENG	Darren Anderton	44	6	33+2	4	3	1	6	1
8	MF	(England) ENG	Tim Sherwood	28	1	15+4	0	4	0	2+3	1
14	MF	(Uruguay) URU	Gus Poyet	43	14	32+2	10	4	3	5	1
17	MF	(Norway) NOR	Øyvind Leonhardsen	13	0	2+5	0	0+2	0	2+2	0
23	MF	(Germany) GER	Christian Ziege	33	7	27	5	2	1	4	1
25	MF	(England) ENG	Stephen Clemence	6	0	4+2	0	0	0	0	0
28	MF	(England) ENG	Matthew Etherington	14	1	3+8	0	1+1	1	0+1	0
29	MF	(Wales) WAL	Simon Davies	41	7	22+9	4	3	0	6+1	3
Forwards
9	FW	(England) ENG	Les Ferdinand	33	15	22+3	9	3	1	5	5
10	FW	(England) ENG	Teddy Sheringham	42	13	33+1	10	2	1	5+1	2
11	FW	(Ukraine) UKR	Serhii Rebrov	39	4	9+21	1	2+1	0	2+4	3
16	FW	(Norway) NOR	Steffen Iversen	24	7	12+6	4	1+2	1	1+2	2

Last updated: 30 May 2002
Source: soccerbase.com

=== Goalscorers ===
The list is sorted by shirt number when total goals are equal.

Rnk	Pos	No.	Player	Premier League	FA Cup	League Cup	Total
1	FW	9	(England) Les Ferdinand	9	1	5	15
2	MF	14	(Uruguay) Gus Poyet	10	3	1	14
3	FW	10	(England) Teddy Sheringham	10	1	2	13
4	FW	16	(Norway) Steffen Iversen	4	1	2	7
4	MF	23	(Germany) Christian Ziege	5	1	1	7
4	MF	29	(Wales) Simon Davies	4	0	3	7
7	MF	7	(England) Darren Anderton	4	1	1	6
8	FW	11	(Ukraine) Serhii Rebrov	1	0	3	4
9	DF	36	(England) Dean Richards	2	0	0	2
10	MF	8	(England) Tim Sherwood	0	0	1	1
10	DF	26	(England) Ledley King	0	0	1	1
10	MF	28	(England) Matthew Etherington	0	1	0	1
TOTALS				49	9	20	78

Last updated: 20 May 2002.
Source: Premier League

=== Clean sheets ===
Rnk	No.	Player	Premier League	FA Cup	League Cup	Total
1	1	(Scotland) Neil Sullivan	6	3	2	11
2	13	(United States) Kasey Keller	2	0	1	3
TOTALS			8	3	3	14

Last updated: 20 May 2002.
Source: League
