= 2001–02 Football League Cup =

Worthington Cup, League Cup

Tournament details
- Country: England; Wales
- Teams: 92

Final positions
- Champions: Blackburn Rovers (1st title)
- Runners-up: Tottenham Hotspur

Tournament statistics
- Top goal scorer(s): Matt Jansen (6 goals)

The 2001–02 Football League Cup (known as the Worthington Cup for sponsorship reasons) was the 42nd staging of the Football League Cup, a knockout competition for England's top 92 football clubs.

The competition began on 20 August 2001, and ended with the final on 26 February 2002 at the Millennium Stadium in Cardiff as Wembley Stadium had been closed for a rebuild.

The tournament was won by Blackburn Rovers, who beat Tottenham Hotspur 2–1 in the final, thanks to single strikes from Matt Jansen and Andy Cole, sandwiched by an equaliser from Christian Ziege. Blackburn had only just returned to the Premier League at the beginning of the season after relegation several years earlier.

== First round ==
The 70 First, Second and Third Division clubs compete from the First Round, except Manchester City and Coventry. Each section is divided equally into a pot of seeded clubs and a pot of unseeded clubs. Clubs' rankings depend upon their finishing position in the 2000–01 season.

Tie no	Home team	Score	Away team	Date
1	Birmingham City	3–0	Southend United	22 August 2001
2	Cambridge United	1–1 (a.e.t.)	West Bromwich Albion	22 August 2001
West Bromwich Albion won 4–3 on penalties
3	Stoke City	0–0 (a.e.t.)	Oldham Athletic	22 August 2001
Oldham Athletic won 6–5 on penalties
4	Wolverhampton Wanderers	1–2	Swindon Town	22 August 2001
5	Barnsley	2–0	Halifax Town	21 August 2001
6	Blackpool	3–2	Wigan Athletic	21 August 2001
7	Bournemouth	0–2	Torquay United	21 August 2001
8	Brentford	1–0	Norwich City	21 August 2001
9	Brighton & Hove Albion	2–1	Wimbledon	21 August 2001
10	Bristol City	2–1	Cheltenham Town	21 August 2001
11	Burnley	2–3	Rushden & Diamonds	21 August 2001
12	Bury	1–3	Sheffield Wednesday	21 August 2001
13	Exeter City	0–1	Walsall	21 August 2001
14	Grimsby Town	2–1	Lincoln City	21 August 2001
15	Huddersfield Town	0–1	Rochdale	21 August 2001
16	Kidderminster Harriers	2–3 (a.e.t.)	Preston North End	21 August 2001
17	Leyton Orient	2–4	Crystal Palace	21 August 2001
18	Macclesfield Town	1–2 (a.e.t.)	Bradford City	21 August 2001
19	Mansfield Town	3–4	Notts County	21 August 2001
20	Millwall	2–1	Cardiff City	21 August 2001
21	Northampton Town	2–1 (a.e.t.)	Queens Park Rangers	21 August 2001
22	Oxford United	1–2 (a.e.t.)	Gillingham	21 August 2001
23	Port Vale	2–1	Chesterfield	21 August 2001
24	Portsmouth	1–2	Colchester United	21 August 2001
25	Reading	4–0	Luton Town	21 August 2001
26	Stockport County	3–0	Carlisle United	21 August 2001
27	Swansea City	0–2	Peterborough United	21 August 2001
28	Tranmere Rovers	3–1	Shrewsbury Town	21 August 2001
29	Watford	1–0	Plymouth Argyle	21 August 2001
30	Wrexham	2–3	Hull City	21 August 2001
31	Wycombe Wanderers	0–1	Bristol Rovers	21 August 2001
32	York City	2–2 (a.e.t.)	Crewe Alexandra	21 August 2001
Crewe Alexandra won 6–5 on penalties
33	Darlington	0–1	Sheffield United	20 August 2001
34	Hartlepool United	0–2	Nottingham Forest	20 August 2001
35	Scunthorpe United	0–2	Rotherham United	20 August 2001

== Second round ==
The 35 winners from the First Round joined the 13 Premier League, clubs not participating in European competition in the Second Round, plus Manchester City and Coventry (who received byes for their league position the previous season). Matches were played on 10–13 September.

Tie no	Home team	Score	Away team	Date
1	Tottenham Hotspur	2–0	Torquay United	13 September 2001
2	Blackburn Rovers	2–0	Oldham Athletic	12 September 2001
3	Bristol City	2–3	Watford	12 September 2001
4	Charlton Athletic	2–0	Port Vale	12 September 2001
5	Derby County	3–0	Hull City	12 September 2001
6	Everton	1–1 (a.e.t.)	Crystal Palace	12 September 2001
Crystal Palace won 5–4 on penalties
7	Newcastle United	4–1 (a.e.t.)	Brentford	12 September 2001
8	Nottingham Forest	1–1 (a.e.t.)	Stockport County	12 September 2001
Nottingham Forest won 8–7 on penalties
9	Sheffield Wednesday	4–2 (a.e.t.)	Sunderland	12 September 2001
10	Bolton Wanderers	4–3 (a.e.t.)	Walsall	11 September 2001
11	Brighton & Hove Albion	0–3	Southampton	11 September 2001
12	Bristol Rovers	0–3	Birmingham City	11 September 2001
13	Colchester United	1–3	Barnsley	11 September 2001
14	Crewe Alexandra	2–0 (a.e.t.)	Rushden & Diamonds	11 September 2001
15	Gillingham	2–1	Millwall	11 September 2001
16	Grimsby Town	3–3 (a.e.t.)	Sheffield United	11 September 2001
Grimsby Town won 4–2 on penalties
17	Middlesbrough	3–1	Northampton Town	11 September 2001
18	Notts County	2–4 (a.e.t.)	Manchester City	11 September 2001
19	Peterborough United	2–2 (a.e.t.)	Coventry City	11 September 2001
Coventry City won 4–2 on penalties
20	Reading	0–0 (a.e.t.)	West Ham	11 September 2001
Reading won 6–5 on penalties
21	Rochdale	2–2 (a.e.t.)	Fulham	11 September 2001
Fulham won 6–5 on penalties
22	Rotherham United	0–4	Bradford City	11 September 2001
23	Tranmere Rovers	4–1	Preston North End	11 September 2001
24	West Bromwich Albion	2–0 (a.e.t.)	Swindon Town	11 September 2001
25	Blackpool	0–1	Leicester City	10 September 2001

== Third round ==
The 25 winners from the Second Round joined the seven Premiership clubs participating in European competition in the Third Round. Matches were played on 8–10 October.

Tie no	Home team	Score	Away team	Date
1	Arsenal	4–0	Manchester United	5 November 2001
2	Aston Villa	1–0	Reading	10 October 2001
3	Blackburn Rovers	2–1 (a.e.t.)	Middlesbrough	10 October 2001
4	Fulham	5–2	Derby County	10 October 2001
5	Manchester City	6–0	Birmingham City	10 October 2001
6	Sheffield Wednesday	2–2 (a.e.t.)	Crystal Palace	10 October 2001
Sheffield Wednesday won 3–1 on penalties
7	Barnsley	0–1	Newcastle United	9 October 2001
8	Coventry City	0–2	Chelsea	9 October 2001
9	Crewe Alexandra	2–3	Ipswich Town	9 October 2001
10	Gillingham	0–2	Southampton	9 October 2001
11	Leicester City	0–6	Leeds United	9 October 2001
12	Liverpool	1–2 (a.e.t.)	Grimsby Town	9 October 2001
13	Tranmere Rovers	0–4	Tottenham Hotspur	9 October 2001
14	Watford	4–1	Bradford City	9 October 2001
15	West Bromwich Albion	0–1	Charlton Athletic	9 October 2001
16	Bolton Wanderers	1–0	Nottingham Forest	8 October 2001

== Fourth round ==
The matches were played on 27–29 November.

29 November 2001
19:45 GMT

Fulham	1–2	Tottenham Hotspur
Hayles 45'		Rebrov 15'; Davies 86'

Craven Cottage, London
Attendance: 17,006
Referee: Mark Halsey

28 November 2001

Aston Villa	0–1	Sheffield Wednesday
		Ekoku 40'

Villa Park, Birmingham
Attendance: 26,526
Referee: Clive Wilkes

28 November 2001

Blackburn Rovers	2–0	Manchester City
Johansson 45'; Johnson 90'

Ewood Park, Blackburn
Attendance: 17,907
Referee: Uriah Rennie

28 November 2001

Leeds United	0–2	Chelsea
		Guðjohnsen 59' 80'

Elland Road, Leeds
Attendance: 33,841
Referee: Jeff Winter

27 November 2001

Arsenal	2–0	Grimsby Town
Edu 4'; Wiltord 74'

Highbury, London
Attendance: 16,917
Referee: Dermot Gallagher

27 November 2001

Bolton Wanderers	2–2 (a.e.t.)	Southampton
Holdsworth 55' (pen.); Ricketts 110'		Davies 80'; El Khalej 111'
Penalties
	6–5

Reebok Stadium, Bolton
Attendance: 8,404
Referee: Andy D'Urso

27 November 2001

Newcastle United	4–1	Ipswich Town
Robert 18'; Ameobi 26'; Shearer 37' 40'		Bent 77'

St. James' Park, Newcastle
Attendance: 32,576
Referee: Alan Wiley

27 November 2001

Watford	3–2 (a.e.t.)	Charlton Athletic
Vernazza 17'; Robinson 60'; Helguson 99'		Brown 43'; Robinson 90'

Vicarage Road, Watford
Attendance: 12,621
Referee: Neale Barry

== Fifth round ==
The four matches were played on 11–12 and 19 December.

19 December 2001

Sheffield Wednesday	4–0	Watford
Sibon 40'; Hamshaw 73'; O'Donnell 89'; Soltvedt 90'

Hillsborough, Sheffield
Attendance: 20,319
Referee: Andy Butler

12 December 2001

Chelsea	1–0	Newcastle United
Hasselbaink 90'

Stamford Bridge, London
Attendance: 27,613
Referee: David Elleray

11 December 2001

Blackburn Rovers	4–0	Arsenal
Jansen 11' 15' 68'; Hughes 21'

Ewood Park, Blackburn
Attendance: 13,278
Referee: Paul Durkin

11 December 2001
19:45 GMT

Tottenham Hotspur	6–0	Bolton Wanderers
Davies 21'; Ferdinand 29' 30' 38'; Barness 79' (o.g.); Iversen 84'

White Hart Lane, London
Attendance: 28,430
Referee: Graham Barber

== Semi-finals ==
The semi-final draw was made in December 2001 after the conclusion of the quarter finals. Unlike the other rounds, the semi-final ties were played over two legs, with each team playing one leg at home. The ties were played in the weeks beginning 7 and 21 January 2002.

=== First leg ===
8 January 2002
19:45 GMT

Sheffield Wednesday	1–2	Blackburn Rovers
Ekoku 52'		Hignett 28'; Cole 39'

Hillsborough, Sheffield
Attendance: 30,883
Referee: Andy D'Urso

9 January 2002
20:05 GMT

Chelsea	2–1	Tottenham Hotspur
Hasselbaink 10' 77'		Ferdinand 65'

Stamford Bridge, London
Attendance: 37,264
Referee: Alan Wiley

=== Second leg ===
22 January 2002
19:45 GMT

Blackburn Rovers	4–2	Sheffield Wednesday
Jansen 35'; Duff 37'; Cole 82'; Hignett 88'		Ekoku 59' (pen.); Soltvedt 85'

Ewood Park, Blackburn
Attendance: 26,884
Referee: Mike Riley

Blackburn Rovers won 6–3 on aggregate.

23 January 2002
20:05 GMT

Tottenham Hotspur	5–1	Chelsea
Iversen 2'; Sherwood 33'; Sheringham 50'; Davies 76'; Rebrov 87'		Forssell 90'

White Hart Lane, London
Attendance: 36,100
Referee: Mark Halsey

Tottenham Hotspur won 6–3 on aggregate

== Final ==
The 2002 Worthington Cup Final was played on 24 February 2002 and was contested between Premier League teams Tottenham Hotspur and Blackburn Rovers at the Millennium Stadium in Cardiff. Blackburn Rovers won the game 2–1.

24 February 2002
15:00 GMT

Blackburn Rovers	2–1	Tottenham Hotspur
Jansen 25'; Cole 69'	Report	Ziege 33'

Millennium Stadium, Cardiff
Attendance: 72,500
Referee: Graham Poll

Blackburn Rovers	Tottenham Hotspur
