= Dean Richards (footballer) =

English footballer (1974–2011)

Personal information
- Full name: Dean Ivor Richards
- Date of birth: 9 June 1974
- Place of birth: Bradford, West Yorkshire, England
- Date of death: 26 February 2011 (aged 36)
- Place of death: Leeds, West Yorkshire, England
- Height: 6 ft 2 in (1.88 m)
- Position: Defender

Youth career
- 1990–1992: Bradford City

Senior career*
Years	Team	Apps	(Gls)
1992–1995	Bradford City	86	(4)
1995	→ Wolverhampton Wanderers (loan)	10	(2)
1995–1999	Wolverhampton Wanderers	112	(5)
1999–2001	Southampton	67	(3)
2001–2005	Tottenham Hotspur	73	(4)
Total		348	(18)

International career
1995	England U21	4	(0)
- * Club domestic league appearances and goals

Dean Ivor Richards (9 June 1974 – 26 February 2011) was an English professional footballer who played as a defender. He began his career at hometown club Bradford City before a four-year stay with Wolverhampton Wanderers. He left to play Premier League football with Southampton and finally Tottenham Hotspur. He also made four appearances for England under-21s.

Richards retired from playing in 2005 due to health concerns, but later returned to the game as a coach at Bradford. He died six years later at the age of 36.

== Personal life ==
Richards was born in Bradford on 9 June 1974. He attended Allerton Middle School and Rhodesway School in Bradford.

== Playing career ==
=== Bradford City ===
As a central-defender, Richards started his career at his hometown club Bradford City as a youth trainee. He signed as a full-time professional in 1992 and made his debut aged 17 in October of the same year in a 3–1 victory over AFC Bournemouth in a game in which he scored. He played 86 league games for the Bantams, scoring four goals, and playing 102 games in all competitions.

=== Wolverhampton Wanderers ===
Richards moved on loan to promotion-chasing Wolverhampton Wanderers in March 1995, making his debut on 1 April in a 1–0 win at Southend. A permanent deal was quickly arranged for a fee which was initially £1.3 million but eventually rose to £1.8m once various clauses took effect.

Richards made four England under-21 appearances at the Toulon Tournament in 1995, making his debut as captain against Brazil. England reached the semi-final of the competition but lost to hosts France.

During the 1995–96 season he was elevated to the role of club captain but, in January 1996, he was in a car crash that initially seemed to only leave him with a bruised ankle but later revealed an injured knee and back issues. He subsequently missed much of the following two seasons due to persistent injuries. On the field, his performances earned the attention of the likes of Arsenal and Manchester United.

He remained with the club until his contract expired at the end of the 1998–99 season; ironically his final game saw his former club Bradford win promotion to the Premier League at Molineux while Wolves missed out on a play-off place.

=== Southampton ===
In July 1999, Richards reached the Premier League when he was signed for Southampton by Dave Jones on a free transfer. He settled quickly into the Southampton side despite replacing the popular Ken Monkou. He was voted the fans' Player of the Year at the end of his first season.

In the three seasons Richards was at the Saints, he made 79 appearances in all competitions and found the net seven times, before joining Tottenham Hotspur in September 2001.

=== Tottenham Hotspur ===
Richards impressed new manager Glenn Hoddle so much that, when Hoddle moved to Tottenham Hotspur in March 2001, he tried to take Richards with him. This led to a drawn-out battle of words between chairman Rupert Lowe and the Tottenham board, which ended when Spurs paid £8.1 million to persuade Lowe to release Richards from his contract which he had only signed a few months earlier. He scored on his debut in a 5–3 home defeat to Manchester United.

Richards never realised his full potential at Tottenham due to persistent injury problems, and never fulfilled his ambition to play for his country. At the time, his transfer fee to Tottenham was the highest amount ever paid by a club for a player who had not played internationally.

In March 2005, he announced his retirement from the game due to illness after receiving "evidence that it would be harmful to his health to continue". A specialist told him that if he continued playing he could suffer from a brain haemorrhage. Richards said: "I am obviously deeply disappointed to be giving up the sport I love, but it's the only choice." He was suffering from frequent dizzy spells and headaches that were initially thought to be an inner-ear infection.

== Coach ==
Having gained his coaching qualifications, Richards returned to Bradford City on 3 August 2007, when it was confirmed that he was taking a part-time role as youth coach. He also worked with a company in Spain.

== Death ==
Richards died at the age of 36 on the morning of 26 February 2011 at St. Gemma's Hospice, Leeds after a long-term illness.

On 6 March 2011, two of his former clubs, Wolves and Tottenham, met in the Premier League. This fixture was designated as a tribute game, and as such featured several official and media tributes to Richards' career and life. Joining the teams in the centre circle at Molineux Stadium for a minute's applause before kick-off were his widow Samantha and his two sons Rio and Jaden as well as representatives from his four former clubs (Ledley King for Tottenham, Claus Lundekvam for Southampton, Matt Murray for Wolves, and Mark Lawn for Bradford City), two of his former managers Graham Taylor and Dave Jones, and two former teammates, Don Goodman and James Beattie.

== Career statistics ==
Appearances and goals by club, season and competition
Club	Season	League			FA Cup		League Cup		Other		Total	
Club	Season	Division	Apps	Goals	Apps	Goals	Apps	Goals	Apps	Goals	Apps	Goals
Bradford City
Bradford City	1991–92	Third Division	7	1	1	0	0	0	1 (Note: Appearances in EFL Trophy)	0	9	1
Bradford City	1992–93	Second Division	3	0	0	0	0	0	2	0	5	0
Bradford City	1993–94	Second Division	46	2	2	0	4	0	1	0	53	2
Bradford City	1994–95	Second Division	30	1	1	1	3	1	1	0	35	3
Bradford City	Total		86	4	4	1	7	1	5	0	102	6
Wolverhampton Wanderers (loan)	1994–95	First Division	10	2	0	0	0	0	2 (Note: Appearances in play-offs)	0	12	2
Wolverhampton Wanderers
Wolverhampton Wanderers	1995–96	First Division	37	1	2	0	5	0	—		44	1
Wolverhampton Wanderers	1996–97	First Division	21	1	0	0	2	0	—		23	1
Wolverhampton Wanderers	1997–98	First Division	13	0	7	1	0	0	—		20	1
Wolverhampton Wanderers	1998–99	First Division	41	3	1	0	4	0	—		46	3
Wolverhampton Wanderers	Total		122	7	10	1	11	0	2	0	145	8
Southampton
Southampton	1999–2000	Premier League	35	2	1	1	2	1	—		38	4
Southampton	2000–01	Premier League	28	1	4	1	2	0	—		34	2
Southampton	2001–02	Premier League	4	0	0	0	1	0	—		5	0
Southampton	Total		67	3	5	2	5	1	0	0	77	6
Tottenham Hotspur
Tottenham Hotspur	2001–02	Premier League	24	2	4	0	0	0	—		28	2
Tottenham Hotspur	2002–03	Premier League	26	2	0	0	1	0	—		27	2
Tottenham Hotspur	2003–04	Premier League	23	0	1	0	2	0	—		26	0
Tottenham Hotspur	Total		73	4	5	0	3	0	0	0	81	4
Career total			348	18	24	4	26	2	7	0	405	24

== Honours ==
Individual

- PFA Team of the Year: 1994–95 Second Division, 1995–96 First Division, 1996–97 First Division
