= 1998–99 Wolverhampton Wanderers F.C. season =

English football club season

Wolverhampton Wanderers
1998–99 season
- Chairman: Sir Jack Hayward OBE
- Manager: Mark McGhee (until 5 November); Colin Lee (from 28 November)
- Football League First Division: 7th
- FA Cup: 4th round
- League Cup: 2nd round
- Top goalscorer: League: Robbie Keane (11); All: Robbie Keane (16)
- Highest home attendance: 27,589 (vs Bradford, 9 May 1999)
- Lowest home attendance: 15,296 (vs Barnet, 18 August 1998)
- Average home league attendance: 22,620 (league only)

The 1998–99 season was the 100th season of competitive league football in the history of English football club Wolverhampton Wanderers. During that season, they played in the second tier of the English football system, the Football League First Division.

The season began with Mark McGhee as manager but he left "by mutual agreement" on 5 November after a run of two victories from fourteen games; the team having begun with four consecutive league wins. Upon McGhee's departure his assistant Colin Lee was placed in charge of the team and, after taking ten points from a possible twelve, he was handed the post for the remainder of the season.

The team finished in seventh place, one position short of the play-offs. Results on the final day, including their own, failed to go in their favour and so they missed out on a chance of promotion to the Premier League. Nonetheless, following the final match, the Wolves board announced that Colin Lee was to be given a permanent contract as manager.

== Results ==
=== Pre-season ===
15 July 1998	Wüstenrot Salzburg	2–0	Wolverhampton Wanderers	Salzburg, Austria
	Glieder 18'; Koejoe 66'			Stadium: Stadion Lehen

18 July 1998	LASK Linz	2–0	Wolverhampton Wanderers	Grieskirchen, Austria
	Weissenberger 43'; Riseth 56'			Stadium: Trattnachtalstadion; Attendance: 2,000

22 July 1998	Carl Zeiss Jena	0–1	Wolverhampton Wanderers	Schleiz, Germany
19:00 CEST			Bull 21'	Stadium: Sportplatz am Fasanengarten

24 July 1998	Union Berlin	1–2	Wolverhampton Wanderers	Berlin, Germany
18:00 CEST	Küntzel 3'		Robinson 11'; Simpson 62'	Stadium: Stadion An der Alten Försterei; Attendance: 2,200

27 July 1998	Wolverhampton Wanderers	1–1	Blackburn Rovers	Wolverhampton
	Naylor 53'		Johnson 78'	Stadium: Molineux; Attendance: 8,243; Referee: Mike Fletcher

29 July 1998	Northampton Town	2–1	Wolverhampton Wanderers	Northampton
	Corazzin 60', 71'		Clarkson 70' (o.g.)	Stadium: Sixfields; Attendance: 2,252; Referee: Paul Rejer

1 August 1998	Wolverhampton Wanderers	2–3	Barcelona	Wolverhampton
	Bull 30'; Osborn 41'		Anderson 10', 62'; Rosas 40'	Stadium: Molineux; Attendance: 18,010; Referee: Mike Reed

=== Football League First Division ===
A total of 24 teams competed in the Football League First Division in the 1998–99 season. Each team played every other team twice: once at their stadium, and once at the opposition's. Three points were awarded to teams for each win, one point per draw, and none for defeats. Teams finishing level on points were firstly divided by the number of goals scored rather than goal difference.

The provisional fixture list was released on 15 June 1998, but was subject to change in the event of matches being selected for television coverage or police concerns.

8 August 1998 1	Wolverhampton Wanderers	2–0	Tranmere Rovers	Wolverhampton
15:00 BST	Keane 19'; Curle 88' (pen.)	Report		Stadium: Molineux; Attendance: 20,203 (703 away); Referee: Paul Taylor

15 August 1998 2	Oxford United	0–2	Wolverhampton Wanderers	Oxford
15:00 BST			Bull 45'; Curle (penalty missed) 80'; Osborn 80'	Stadium: Manor Ground; Attendance: 7,521 (3,100 away); Referee: Matt Mathias

22 August 1998 3	Wolverhampton Wanderers	1–0	Swindon Town	Wolverhampton
15:00 BST	Curle 29' (pen.)	Report		Stadium: Molineux; Attendance: 21,537 (843 away); Referee: Graham Frankland

28 August 1998 4	Watford	0–2	Wolverhampton Wanderers	Watford
19:45 BST		Report	Bull 44'; Keane 46'	Stadium: Vicarage Road; Attendance: 12,016 (1,686 away); Referee: Kevin Lynch

31 August 1998 5	Wolverhampton Wanderers	2–2	Stockport County	Wolverhampton
15:00 BST	Richards 6'; Gómez 37'	Report	Angell 44', 53'	Stadium: Molineux; Attendance: 22,217 (784 away); Referee: George Cain

8 September 1998 6	Port Vale	2–1	Wolverhampton Wanderers	Burslem
19:45 BST	Beadle 14'; Naylor 58'	Report	Keane 67'	Stadium: Vale Park; Attendance: 8,087 (3,164 away); Referee: John Kirkby

12 September 1998 7	Wolverhampton Wanderers	1–1	Sunderland	Wolverhampton
15:00 BST	Keane 68'	Report	Phillips 90+3'	Stadium: Molineux; Attendance: 26,816 (2,983 away); Referee: Eddie Wolstenholme

19 September 1998 8	Huddersfield Town	2–1	Wolverhampton Wanderers	Huddersfield
15:00 BST	Dalton 19'; Thornley 90+4'	Report	Keane 90+2'	Stadium: McAlpine Stadium; Attendance: 13,854 (1,824 away); Referee: Chris Foy

26 September 1998 9	Wolverhampton Wanderers	1–0	Bury	Wolverhampton
15:00 BST	Bull 66'	Report		Stadium: Molineux; Attendance: 20,155 (671 away); Referee: Mike Jones

29 September 1998 10	Wolverhampton Wanderers	1–2	Queens Park Rangers	Wolverhampton
19:45 BST	Foley 75'	Report	Sheron 2', 9'	Stadium: Molineux; Attendance: 20,201 (684 away); Referee: David Pugh

3 October 1998 11	Crewe Alexandra	0–0	Wolverhampton Wanderers	Crewe
15:00 BST		Report		Stadium: Gresty Road; Attendance: 5,759 (1,632 away); Referee: Andy D'Urso

17 October 1998 12	Portsmouth	1–0	Wolverhampton Wanderers	Portsmouth
15:00 BST	McLoughlin 66' (pen.)	Report		Stadium: Fratton Park; Attendance: 13,681 (1,411 away); Referee: Paul Danson

20 October 1998 13	Crystal Palace	3–2	Wolverhampton Wanderers	London
19:45 BST	Moore 40'; Lombardo (penalty missed) 51'; Burton 52'; Ćurčić 84'	Report	Sedgley 63', 86'	Stadium: Selhurst Park; Attendance: 16,417 (1,422 away); Referee: Andy Butler

24 October 1998 14	Wolverhampton Wanderers	2–0	Grimsby Town	Wolverhampton
15:00 BST	Foley 21'; Curle 36' (pen.)	Report		Stadium: Molineux; Attendance: 18,480 (628 away); Referee: Eddie Lomas

31 October 1998 15	Wolverhampton Wanderers	1–1	Barnsley	Wolverhampton
15:00 GMT	Muscat 5' (pen.)	Report	Ward 52' (pen.)	Stadium: Molineux; Attendance: 20,714 (1,243 away); Referee: Scott Mathieson

3 November 1998 16	Ipswich Town	2–0	Wolverhampton Wanderers	Ipswich
19:45 GMT	Scowcroft 17'; Stockwell 90'	Report		Stadium: Portman Road; Attendance: 14,680 (564 away); Referee: Roger Furnandiz

7 November 1998 17	Bristol City	1–6	Wolverhampton Wanderers	Bristol
15:00 GMT	Hutchings 12'	Report	Whittingham 19'; Connolly 22', 57', 67', 77'; Robinson 79'	Stadium: Ashton Gate; Attendance: 15,432 (2,000 away); Referee: Paul Taylor

10 November 1998 18	Wolverhampton Wanderers	2–1	Sheffield United	Wolverhampton
19:45 GMT	Connolly 50'; Robinson 55'	Report	Stuart 44'	Stadium: Molineux; Attendance: 20,804 (684 away); Referee: Roy Pearson

14 November 1998 19	Norwich City	0–0	Wolverhampton Wanderers	Norwich
15:00 GMT		Report		Stadium: Carrow Road; Attendance: 17,275 (1,186 away); Referee: Phil Richards

22 November 1998 20	Wolverhampton Wanderers	3–1	Birmingham City	Wolverhampton
13:00 GMT	Naylor 72'; Robinson 80', 90+1'	Report	Furlong 21'	Stadium: Molineux; Attendance: 23,037 (2,778 away); Referee: Terry Heilbron

29 November 1998 21	West Bromwich Albion	2–0	Wolverhampton Wanderers	West Bromwich
13:00 GMT	Kilbane 46'; Murphy 61'	Report		Stadium: The Hawthorns; Attendance: 22,682 (5,133 away); Referee: Graham Laws

5 December 1998 22	Wolverhampton Wanderers	1–1	Bolton Wanderers	Wolverhampton
15:00 GMT	Emblen 72'	Report	Taylor 58'	Stadium: Molineux; Attendance: 22,537 (1,163 away); Referee: Clive Wilkes

12 December 1998 23	Wolverhampton Wanderers	2–2	Norwich City	Wolverhampton
15:00 GMT	Keane 84', 89'	Report	Adams 31' (pen.); Roberts 60'	Stadium: Molineux; Attendance: 21,014 (1,284 away); Referee: John Kirkby

19 December 1998 24	Bradford City	2–1	Wolverhampton Wanderers	Bradford
15:00 GMT	Blake 20'; Mills 50'	Report	Keane 67'	Stadium: Valley Parade; Attendance: 13,846 (2,332 away); Referee: Steve Bennett

26 December 1998 25	Swindon Town	1–0	Wolverhampton Wanderers	Swindon
15:00 GMT	Onuora 89'	Report		Stadium: County Ground; Attendance: 11,627 (1,936 away); Referee: Fraser Stretton

28 December 1998 26	Wolverhampton Wanderers	1–0	Ipswich Town	Wolverhampton
13:00 GMT	Muscat 88'	Report		Stadium: Molineux; Attendance: 24,636 (1,500 away); Referee: Mark Halsey

8 January 1999 27	Tranmere Rovers	1–2	Wolverhampton Wanderers	Birkenhead
19:45 GMT	Santos 20'	Report	Keane 1'; Gómez 12'	Stadium: Prenton Park; Attendance: 6,179 (1,732 away); Referee: Kevin Lynch

16 January 1999 28	Wolverhampton Wanderers	0–0	Watford	Wolverhampton
15:00 GMT		Report		Stadium: Molineux; Attendance: 23,408 (1,500 away); Referee: Brian Coddington

30 January 1999 29	Stockport County	1–2	Wolverhampton Wanderers	Stockport
15:00 GMT	Angell 56'	Report	Richards 54'; Robinson 74'	Stadium: Edgeley Park; Attendance: 8,654 (2,137 away); Referee: George Cain

6 February 1999 30	Wolverhampton Wanderers	1–1	Oxford United	Wolverhampton
15:00 GMT	Keane 36'	Report	Windass 39'	Stadium: Molineux; Attendance: 20,811 (645 away); Referee: Andy Butler

13 February 1999 31	Wolverhampton Wanderers	3–1	Port Vale	Wolverhampton
15:00 GMT	Simpson 2'; Keane 32'; Curle 89' (pen.)	Report	Bogie 4'	Stadium: Molineux; Attendance: 20,488 (1,362 away); Referee: Phil Richards

20 February 1999 32	Sunderland	2–1	Wolverhampton Wanderers	Sunderland
15:00 GMT	Johnston 10'; Quinn 90+'	Report	Melville 23' (o.g.)	Stadium: Stadium of Light; Attendance: 41,268 (2,900 away); Referee: Phil Richards

27 February 1999 33	Wolverhampton Wanderers	2–2	Huddersfield Town	Wolverhampton
15:00 GMT	Robinson 10'; Gray 64' (o.g.)	Report	Gray 59'; Hamilton 90+'	Stadium: Molineux; Attendance: 21,778 (995 away); Referee: Scott Mathieson

6 March 1999 34	Queens Park Rangers	0–1	Wolverhampton Wanderers	London
15:00 GMT		Report	Sedgley 84'	Stadium: Loftus Road; Attendance: 13,150 (2,597 away); Referee: Michael Pierce

13 March 1999 35	Wolverhampton Wanderers	3–0	Bristol City	Wolverhampton
15:00 GMT	Flo 14', 84'; Sebők 53' (o.g.)	Report		Stadium: Molineux; Attendance: 25,237 (2,787 away); Referee: David Crick

16 March 1999 36	Bury	0–0	Wolverhampton Wanderers	Bury
19:45 GMT		Report		Stadium: Gigg Lane; Attendance: 5,204 (688 away); Referee: Paul Robinson

20 March 1999 37	Barnsley	2–3	Wolverhampton Wanderers	Barnsley
15:00 GMT	Richards 31' (o.g.); Jones 33'	Report	Emblen 41'; Connolly 78'; Richards 90'	Stadium: Oakwell; Attendance: 16,587 (4,200 away); Referee: Mike Dean

30 March 1999 38	Wolverhampton Wanderers	3–0	Crewe Alexandra	Wolverhampton
19:45 BST	Robinson 14'; Flo 25'; Muscat 78' (pen.)	Report		Stadium: Molineux; Attendance: 24,197 (612 away); Referee: Eddie Wolstenholme

3 April 1999 39	Wolverhampton Wanderers	2–0	Portsmouth	Wolverhampton
15:00 BST	Muscat 71'; Flo 76'	Report		Stadium: Molineux; Attendance: 23,262 (811 away); Referee: Clive Wilkes

5 April 1999 40	Sheffield United	1–1	Wolverhampton Wanderers	Sheffield
15:00 BST	Marcelo 62'	Report	Osborn 86'	Stadium: Bramall Lane; Attendance: 21,761 (3,075 away); Referee: Rob Styles

10 April 1999 41	Wolverhampton Wanderers	0–0	Crystal Palace	Wolverhampton
15:00 BST		Report		Stadium: Molineux; Attendance: 23,643 (723 away); Referee: Terry Heilbron

17 April 1999 42	Birmingham City	0–1	Wolverhampton Wanderers	Birmingham
15:00 BST		Report	Corica 13'	Stadium: St Andrew's; Attendance: 28,143 (2,738 away); Referee: Barry Knight

25 April 1999 43	Wolverhampton Wanderers	1–1	West Bromwich Albion	Wolverhampton
13:00 BST	Robinson 37'; Curle (penalty missed) 53'	Report	Evans 18'	Stadium: Molineux; Attendance: 27,038 (3,194 away); Referee: Michael Pierce

30 April 1999 44	Bolton Wanderers	1–1	Wolverhampton Wanderers	Bolton
19:45 BST	Gardner 36'	Report	Corica 52'	Stadium: Reebok Stadium; Attendance: 20,208 (1,328 away); Referee: Paul Taylor

4 May 1999 45	Grimsby Town	0–0	Wolverhampton Wanderers	Cleethorpes
19:45 BST		Report		Stadium: Blundell Park; Attendance: 7,009 (1,991 away); Referee: Graham Frankland

9 May 1999 46	Wolverhampton Wanderers	2–3	Bradford City	Wolverhampton
13:30 BST	Flo 12'; Simpson 81'	Report	Beagrie 25'; Mills 40'; Blake 64'; Beagrie (penalty missed) 78'	Stadium: Molineux; Attendance: 27,589 (3,197 away); Referee: Chris Foy

Final table

Pos	Team	Pld	W	D	L	GF	GA	GD	Pts
5	Watford	46	21	14	11	65	56	+9	77
6	Bolton Wanderers	46	20	16	10	78	59	+19	76
7	Wolverhampton Wanderers	46	19	16	11	64	43	+21	73
8	Sheffield United	46	18	13	15	71	66	+5	67

Source: Statto.com

Results summary

Overall								Home						Away					
Pld	W	D	L	GF	GA	GD	Pts	W	D	L	GF	GA	GD	W	D	L	GF	GA	GD
46	19	16	11	64	43	+21	73	11	10	2	37	19	+18	8	6	9	27	24	+3

Source: Statto.com

Results by round

Round	1	2	3	4	5	6	7	8	9	10	11	12	13	14	15	16	17	18	19	20	21	22	23	24	25	26	27	28	29	30	31	32	33	34	35	36	37	38	39	40	41	42	43	44	45	46
Result	W	W	W	W	D	L	D	L	W	L	D	L	L	W	D	L	W	W	D	W	L	D	D	L	L	W	W	D	W	D	W	L	D	W	W	D	W	W	W	D	D	W	D	D	D	L
Position	1	1	4	1	2	4	4	7	4	7	8	10	14	12	10	11	8	7	7	5	8	10	11	12	12	12	10	11	9	9	7	8	7	9	6	6	6	6	6	5	5	6	6	7	7	7

Source: Statto.com
W = Win; D = Draw; L = Loss

=== FA Cup ===
2 January 1999 R3	Bolton Wanderers	1–2	Wolverhampton Wanderers	Bolton
15:00 GMT	Sellars 57'	Report	Keane 8', 65'	Stadium: Reebok Stadium; Attendance: 18,269 (2,377 away); Referee: Andy D'Urso

24 January 1999 R4	Wolverhampton Wanderers	1–2	Arsenal	Wolverhampton
15:30 GMT	Flo 37'	Report	Overmars 10'; Bergkamp 69'	Stadium: Molineux; Attendance: 27,511 (3,196 away); Referee: Steve Dunn

=== League Cup ===
11 August 1998 R1.1	Barnet	2–1	Wolverhampton Wanderers	London
19:45 BST	McGleish 68'; Currie 90'	Report	Osborn 77'	Stadium: Underhill; Attendance: 3,181 (996 away); Referee: Fraser Stretton

18 August 1998 R1.2	Wolverhampton Wanderers	5–0 (6–2 agg.)	Barnet	Wolverhampton
19:45 BST	Bull 14', 35', 79'; Keane 45', 74'	Report		Stadium: Molineux; Attendance: 15,296 (236 away); Referee: Steve Baines

15 September 1998 R2.1	Bournemouth	1–1	Wolverhampton Wanderers	Bournemouth
19:45 BST	Stein 17'		Ferguson 83'	Stadium: Dean Court; Attendance: 7,096 (938 away); Referee: Rob Styles

22 September 1998 R2.2	Wolverhampton Wanderers	1–2 (2–3 agg.)	Bournemouth	Wolverhampton
19:45 BST	Keane 57'	Report	Stein 21', 60'	Stadium: Molineux; Attendance: 15,431 (557 away); Referee: Anthony Leake

== Players ==
Key:
‡ On loan from another club * First appearance(s) for the club

- # = Squad number
- Pos = Playing position
- P = Number of games played
- G = Number of goals scored
- GK = Goalkeeper
- DF = Defender
- MF = Midfielder
- FW = Forward
- = Yellow cards
- = Red cards
- † Permanent player left club during the season
- ¤ Loaned to another club for part or all of season

Correct as of end of season. Starting appearances are listed first, followed by substitute appearances in parentheses where applicable.

Pos	Name	P	G	P	G	P	G	P	G	A yellow card	A red card	Notes
Pos	Name	League		FA Cup		League Cup		Total		Discipline		Notes
GK	(England) Justin Bray	0	0	0	0	0	0	0	0	0	0	
GK	(England) Matt Murray	0	0	0	0	0	0	0	0	0	0	
GK	(Denmark) Jørgen Nielsen ‡	0	0	0	0	0	0	0	0	0	0	
GK	(England) Mike Stowell	46	0	2	0	4	0	52	0	0	0	
DF	(England) Keith Curle (c)	44	4	2	0	3	0	49	4	8	1	
DF	(Wales) Ryan Green	1	0	0	0	0	0	1	0	0	0	
DF	(Australia) Kevin Muscat	17(6)	4	2	0	4	0	23(6)	4	12	0	
DF	(England) Lee Naylor	24(6)	1	0	0	4	0	28(6)	1	0	0	
DF	(England) Dean Richards	40(1)	3	1	0	4	0	45(1)	3	5	0	
DF	(Northern Ireland) Gordon Simms	0	0	0	0	0	0	0	0	0	0	
DF	(Wales) Ady Williams	0	0	0	0	1	0	1	0	0	0	
MF	(England) Mark Atkins	15	0	2	0	0(1)	0	17(1)	0	0	1	
MF	(Australia) Steve Corica	18(5)	2	1	0	1(1)	0	20(6)	2	1	0	
MF	(England) Neil Emblen	30(3)	2	2	0	2(1)	0	34(4)	2	3	0	
MF	(Scotland) Darren Ferguson ¤	2(2)	0	0	0	0(2)	1	2(4)	1	1	0	
MF	(England) Steve Froggatt †	8	0	0	0	2(1)	0	10(1)	0	2	0	
MF	(Barbados) Michael Gilkes	25(4)	0	2	0	0(1)	0	27(5)	0	3	0	
MF	(Spain) Fernando Gómez	18(1)	2	1	0	2	0	21(1)	2	0	0	
MF	(England) Darren Middleton	0	0	0	0	0	0	0	0	0	0	
MF	(Germany) Robert Niestroj	2(2)	0	1	0	0	0	3(2)	0	1	0	
MF	(England) Simon Osborn	35(2)	2	1	0	4	1	40(2)	3	9	0	
MF	(Wales) Carl Robinson	19(5)	8	2	0	1	0	22(5)	8	4	0	
MF	(England) Steve Sedgley	41(3)	3	0(1)	0	3	0	44(4)	3	8	0	
MF	(England) Paul Simpson ¤	8(3)	2	0(1)	0	1	0	9(4)	2	0	0	
MF	(Republic of Ireland) Andy Turner	0	0	0	0	0	0	0	0	0	0	
FW	(England) Steve Bull	11(4)	3	0	0	2	3	13(4)	6	1	0	
FW	(England) Steve Claridge †	0	0	0	0	0	0	0	0	0	0	
FW	(Republic of Ireland) David Connolly ‡	18(14)	6	0(1)	0	2	0	20(15)	6	1	0	
FW	(Republic of Ireland) Glen Crowe ¤†	0	0	0	0	0	0	0	0	0	0	
FW	(Norway) Håvard Flo	18(1)	5	1	1	0	0	19(1)	6	1	0	
FW	(Republic of Ireland) Dominic Foley ¤	2(3)	2	0	0	0	0	2(3)	2	0	0	
FW	(England) Mark Jones	0(2)	0	0	0	0(2)	0	0(4)	0	1	0	
FW	(Republic of Ireland) Robbie Keane	30(3)	11	2	2	4	3	36(3)	16	1	0	
FW	(Republic of Ireland) Colin Larkin	0	0	0	0	0	0	0	0	0	0	
FW	(Finland) Mixu Paatelainen †	0	0	0	0	0	0	0	0	0	0	
FW	(England) Adam Proudlock	0	0	0	0	0	0	0	0	0	0	
FW	(England) Guy Whittingham ‡	9(1)	1	0	0	0	0	9(1)	1	0	0	

== Transfers ==
=== In ===
Date	Player	From	Fee
5 August 1998	(Spain) Fernando Gómez	(Spain) Valencia	Free
13 November 1998	(Germany) Robert Niestroj	(Germany) Fortuna Düsseldorf	£500,000
13 January 1999	(Norway) Håvard Flo	(Germany) Werder Bremen	£700,000
25 March 1999	(England) Darren Middleton	Aston Villa	Free
25 March 1999	(Republic of Ireland) Andy Turner	Crystal Palace	Free

=== Out ===
Date	Player	To	Fee
June 1998	(England) Tony Daley	Released	Free
June 1998	(England) Don Goodman	Released	Free
June 1998	(Poland) Dariusz Kubicki	Released	Free
June 1998	(England) Richard Leadbeater	Released	Free
June 1998	(Netherlands) Hans Segers	Released	Free
June 1998	(Australia) Robbie Slater	Released	Free
June 1998	(England) Chris Westwood	Released	Free
6 August 1998	(Scotland) Dougie Freedman	Nottingham Forest	£950,000
6 August 1998	(Grenada) Jason Roberts	Bristol Rovers	£250,000
10 August 1998	(England) Steve Claridge	Portsmouth	£200,000
11 September 1998	(Finland) Mixu Paatelainen	(Scotland) Hibernian	£75,000
1 October 1998	(England) Steve Froggatt	Coventry City	£1.9 million
27 January 1999	(Republic of Ireland) Glen Crowe	Plymouth Argyle	Free

=== Loans in ===
Start date	Player	From	End date
20 August 1998	(Republic of Ireland) David Connolly	(Netherlands) Feyenoord	End of season
2 November 1998	(England) Guy Whittingham	Sheffield Wednesday	28 December 1998
25 March 1999	(Denmark) Jørgen Nielsen	Liverpool	End of season

=== Loans out ===
Start date	Player	To	End date
1 August 1998	(Republic of Ireland) Glen Crowe	Exeter City	26 September 1998
18 September 1998	(England) Paul Simpson	Walsall	5 October 1998
8 December 1998	(Republic of Ireland) Dominic Foley	Notts County	31 December 1998
11 December 1998	(England) Paul Simpson	Walsall	11 January 1999
26 January 1999	(Scotland) Darren Ferguson	(Netherlands) Sparta Rotterdam	26 April 1999
4 February 1999	(Republic of Ireland) Dominic Foley	(Greece) Ethnikos Piraeus	24 March 1999

== Kit ==
The season brought a new home kit as the design returned to a plain gold shirt with black collar. The away kit, a white away shirt with a dark green collar and dark green shorts, was retained from the previous season. Both were manufactured by Puma and sponsored by Goodyear.
