= Kevin Gibbens =

English footballer (born 1979)

Personal information
- Date of birth: 4 November 1979 (age 46)
- Place of birth: Southampton, England
- Height: 5 ft 11 in (1.80 m)
- Position: Midfielder

Team information
- Current team: Blackfield & Langley (player-manager)

Youth career
- 1996–1998: Southampton

Senior career*
Years	Team	Apps	(Gls)
1998–2002	Southampton	9	(0)
1999	→ Stockport County (loan)	2	(0)
2002	Oxford United		
- Basingstoke Town
2004–2012	Sholing	158	(76)
2012–2015	Blackfield & Langley	126	(22)
2015–2016	Andover Town	8	(3)

Managerial career
- 2013–?: Blackfield & Langley
- * Club domestic league appearances and goals

Kevin Gibbens (born 4 November 1979) is an English former professional footballer who played as a midfielder.

== Playing career ==
=== Southampton ===
Gibbens made his debut for Southampton on 4 April 1998 against Sheffield Wednesday, coming on in the 58th minute for Matt Le Tissier.

=== Sholing ===
Gibbens joined Sholing (then VTFC) in August 2004, staying at the club for eight years.

=== Blackfield & Langley ===
Gibbens joined Wessex League side Blackfield & Langley in July 2012.

=== Andover Town ===
After leaving Blackfield, Gibbens signed for Andover Town in August 2015.

== Managerial career ==
On 17 December 2013, it was announced that Gibbens was to become player-manager of Blackfield & Langley, following the departure of Glenn Burnett.
