= David Elleray =

English football referee

David Elleray MBE
- Full name: David Roland Elleray
- Born: 3 September 1954 (age 72); Dover, Kent, England
- Other occupation: Technical Director, IFAB

Domestic
Years	League	Role
?–?	Hellenic League	Referee
?–?	Isthmian League	Referee
1986–1992	The Football League	Referee
1992–2003	Premier League	Referee

International
Years	League	Role
1992–1999	FIFA listed	Referee

David Roland Elleray MBE (born 3 September 1954) is an English former football referee who officiated in the Football League, Premier League and FIFA competitions. As of September 2021, he held the position of Technical Director at the IFAB.

During his career as a prominent referee, Elleray officiated for a number of notable matches, including the FA Cup final, the highest domestic honour for an English referee. Due to his Oxbridge background and "day job" as a teacher at a public school, Elleray has been described as "schoolmasterly" and "posh" by the press. His teaching role entailed time conflicts with his role as a leading referee before his retirement. He has periodically advised football boards.

== Early life ==
Born in Dover, Kent, Elleray was educated at Dover Grammar School for Boys where he excelled at a range of sports and started refereeing football games at the age of 13 to earn extra pocket money. He gained a scholarship to read geography at Hertford College, Oxford and was a keen rugby player and rower. While at university, he was promoted through the Hellenic, Isthmian and Panel Leagues and eventually became a referee for the Football League in 1986. He remained there until his inclusion on the original Premier League Referees' List in 1992, and also became a FIFA referee in that year.

== Career ==
Elleray is a career geography teacher and spent over thirty years at Harrow School, where he held various positions, such as head of geography, director of boarding, and housemaster of Druries House, before his retirement in 2009. Early in his teaching career, he was noted for controversially reintroducing in 1977 football (which had not been played there since 1927) at Harrow, a school better known for its rugby and cricket traditions.

Elleray stepped down as a FIFA-listed referee in 1999, having officiated 78 international matches in 35 countries. He officiated at Wembley Stadium 13 times but was unable to officiate at the 1998 World Cup in France due to school commitments.

During his refereeing career, Elleray is remembered for a number of incidents, including awarding a dubious penalty kick to Manchester United in the 1994 FA Cup final against Chelsea. Elleray later admitted in his autobiography that he "blew without thinking" and although he knew he had made a mistake, he could not change his mind.

In 1997, Elleray was yet again at the centre of controversy when, during the FA Cup Semi-final between third-tier's Chesterfield FC and Premier League's Middlesbrough FC, he failed to award a goal to Chesterfield after the ball had clearly bounced over the line and surprisingly, awarded a free-kick to Middlesbrough instead. The match finished 3-3, with Middlesbrough winning the replay 3-0, thus ending Chesterfield's hopes of reaching the final.

He was the referee when Ryan Giggs scored his 'wonder goal' in the 1999 FA Cup semi-final replay against Arsenal at Villa Park, and when David Beckham scored from inside his own half against Wimbledon in 1996. Even though he sent off Manchester United's Roy Keane four times including the match Keane done the infamous tackle on Alf-Inge Haaland in the Manchester derby in 2001, after Elleray retired, in 2003, Keane sent him a letter wishing him well and a signed jersey. In 2024, while working as a pundit in the Stick to Football podcast, Keane along with Gary Neville implied that Elleray's multiple red cards to Keane represented "a class system thing," with Ian Wright concurring: "I got the same vibe."

In 1999, Elleray received death threats from Manchester United supporters after Liverpool made a comeback which could have prevented their team winning the title. He'd awarded Liverpool a dubious penalty and then sent Denis Irwin off for attempting a pass because the player ostensibly had not seen the official's flag. Liverpool equalized the game to 2–2. Martin Edwards, United's chairman, suggested that a winners' medal be made for Elleray should Arsenal win the league. The result however did not impact United's pole position, or their winning the title that season, with Arsenal losing at Leeds a few days later.

In 2002, he gave then 17 year old Wayne Rooney his first ever red card. The same year, Elleray was voted onto the FA Council as representative of independent schools.

He retired from refereeing at the end of the 2002–03 season. His last match was Newcastle United's 1–0 win over Birmingham on 3 May 2003, during which he sent off Blues defender Matthew Upson.

In 2003, Premier League referee Jeff Winter wrote that Elleray, who was at the forefront of English and world refereeing for well over a decade, gained the reputation of being "very strict" on the field but "the respect he has from the players shows that his approach has been fair, firm and consistent," and cited Elleray as "an example" to referees.

== Post-retirement ==
In 2004, Elleray accepted the position as Honorary President of the Board of the Referees' Association of England for three years, and was a FIFA and UEFA referee assessor and instructor. He was chairman of the Independent Schools Football Association.

Elleray was awarded an honorary doctorate from Sheffield Hallam University in 2010. He was appointed Member of the Order of the British Empire (MBE) in the 2014 Birthday Honours for services to football.

He has held the position of Technical Director for the International Football Association Board since at least May 2016.

One of the most recognisable figures in English football, Elleray's life featured in an award-winning documentary, The Man in Black, for Channel 4.

== Bibliography ==
- Referee!: A Year in the Life David Elleray. Bloomsbury Publishing. 1998. ISBN 9780747536925.
- The Man in the Middle. Time Warner. 2004. ISBN 9780751535808.

Preceded by Keren Barratt	FA Cup final Referee; 1994	Succeeded by Gerald Ashby
