= Neale Barry =

English football referee

- Full name: Neale S Barry
- Born: 4 June 1958 (age 68); Scunthorpe, Lincolnshire, England

Domestic
Years	League	Role
? –1990	Northern Counties East League	Referee
1990–1993	Football League	Asst. referee
1993–1997	Football League	Referee
1997–2005	Premier League	Referee

International
Years	League	Role
? – ?	UEFA listed	Referee

Neale S. Barry (born 4 June 1958) is a retired English football referee, and current FA Head of Senior Referee Development. He originates from Scunthorpe, Lincolnshire, and now lives near Grantham, Lincolnshire.

== Career ==
He started his refereeing career locally in 1974, officiating in the Lincoln League and the Northern Counties East League, before becoming an assistant referee on the Football League (National) List in 1990.

In 1993, Barry was appointed to the National List of referees, where he took charge of over 400 games in all. He refereed the 1997 Division One Play-off Final between Crystal Palace and Sheffield United at Wembley, when Palace defeated their opponents 1–0, courtesy of a last-minute goal by David Hopkin.

His inclusion on the FA Premier League list of referees followed for the season 1997–1998. His first ever appointment in the competition was the match between Crystal Palace and Barnsley on 12 August 1997, at Selhurst Park – a 1–0 away win, the goal coming from Neil Redfearn.

Barry then progressed to the Select Group in 2001, and refereed a total of 158 matches in the Premier League.

In 2002, he took charge of the FA Trophy Final when Yeovil Town defeated Stevenage Borough by 2 goals to 1.

In 2000, Barry notably turned down Italian striker Paolo Di Canio's penalty claims three times in the game West Ham United F.C.-Bradford City A.F.C. and once again in the game Sunderland F.C.-West Ham United F.C. He gained wide experience in Europe as a match official, being appointed to 26 games abroad during his career.

He was never given the honour of refereeing an FA Cup Final, but was appointed fourth official in the Final which preceded his retirement in 2005. This was the 0–0 draw with Manchester United which Arsenal won 5–4 on penalties after extra time.

Neale Barry's last Premiership game as man-in-the-middle was the 3–2 win for Bolton Wanderers at home to Everton on 15 May 2005, when he was unfortunately required to send off Bolton's Bruno Ngotty for violent conduct.

He was appointed to the Referees List for the following season (2005–2006). However, on 27 July 2005, the Football Association announced that he would be retiring from active refereeing, and taking up the position of Head of Senior Referee Development within their organisation, his responsibility being to retain and develop all referees between County and Professional Levels (Ian Blanchard fulfilling a similar role for those referees below County Level).

Preceded by Alan Wiley	FA Trophy; 2002	Succeeded by Uriah Rennie
