= Jeff Winter =

English football referee

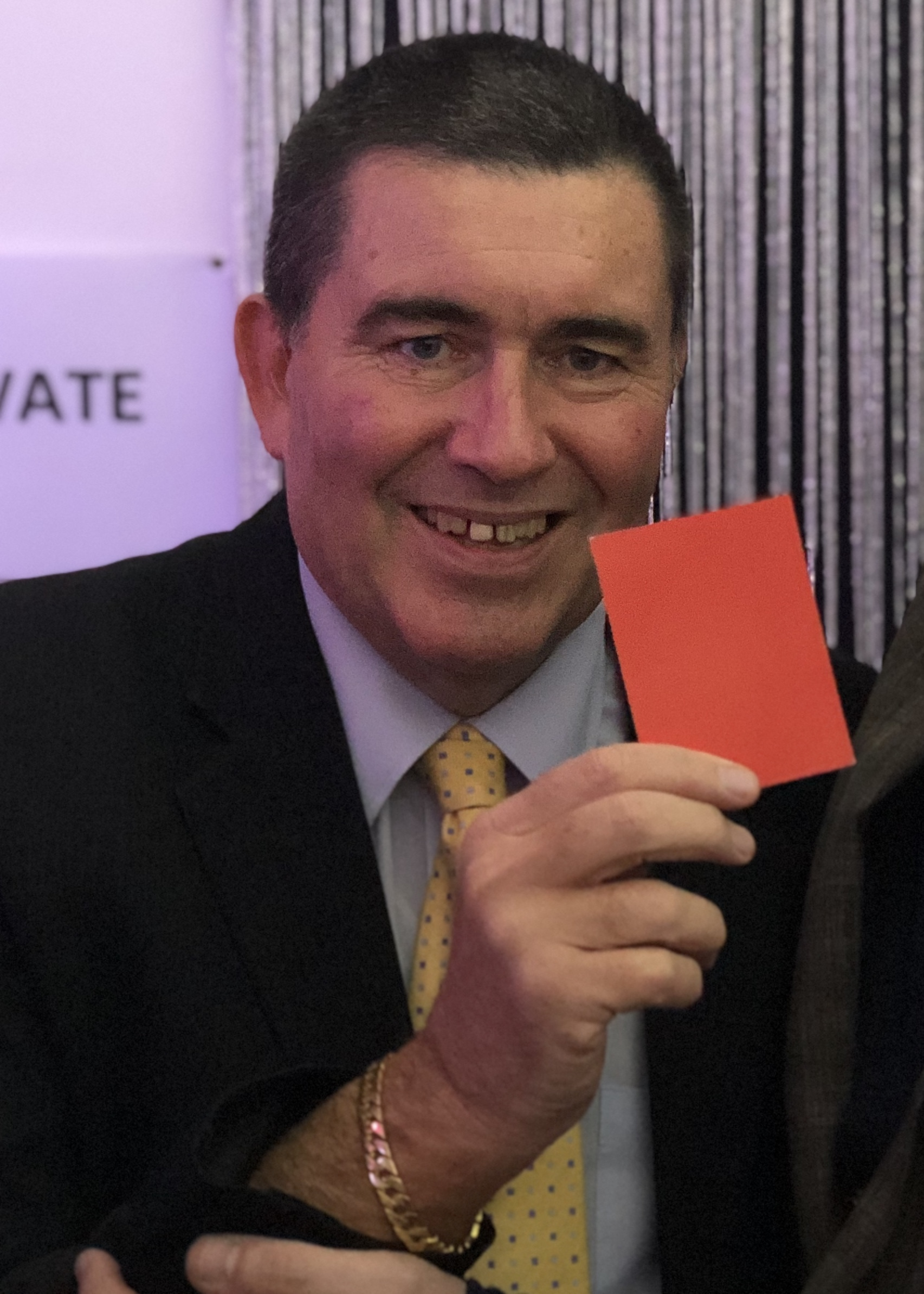
- Winter in 2020
- Born: 18 April 1955 (age 71); Middlesbrough, England

Domestic
| Years | League | Role |
| 1995–2004 | Premier League | Referee |

Jeff Winter (born 18 April 1955) is a former Premier League referee.

== Refereeing career ==
Winter took charge of the 2004 FA Cup final between Manchester United and Millwall, his final game as a professional referee before retirement. Winter also appeared as an official on the BBC TV programme Superstars.

Since 2006, he has officiated in the annual series of national six-a-side tournaments called Masters Football, referees for which are FA endorsed. This competition features ex-professional footballers chosen by the PFA, and is televised on Sky Sports.

== Media work ==
He worked for TFM Radio on Teesside until June 2008 and currently writes many columns for local and national media, all of which can be found on his official site.

== Personal life ==
He supports Middlesbrough F.C., Stockton Town F.C., and Rangers F.C. It is rumoured he was due to officiate in the 2004 Football League Cup final only to be ruled out due to Middlesbrough appearing in the final against Bolton Wanderers so was instead there as a fan.

== Writing ==
Winter brought out his autobiography in 2006, entitled Who's The B*****d in the Black?.

| Preceded by Graham Barber | FA Cup Final referee 2004 | Succeeded by Rob Styles |
