= 1994–95 Tottenham Hotspur F.C. season =

English football club season

Tottenham Hotspur
1994–95 season
- Chairman: Alan Sugar
- Manager: Osvaldo Ardiles (until 1 November); Steve Perryman (caretaker from 1–15 November); Gerry Francis (from 15 November)
- Stadium: White Hart Lane
- Premiership: 7th
- FA Cup: Semi-finals
- League Cup: Third round
- Top goalscorer: League: Jürgen Klinsmann (20); All: Jürgen Klinsmann (29)
- Highest home attendance: 33,040 vs Leeds United (14 May 1995, Premier League)
- Lowest home attendance: 17,798 vs Watford (4 Oct 1994, League Cup)
- Average home league attendance: 27,259

The 1994-95 season was the 113th season in the history of Tottenham Hotspur Football Club, their 17th consecutive season in the top flight of English football and their third season in the FA Premier League. The club also participated in the FA Cup and the Football League Cup.

== Season summary ==
Tottenham Hotspur began the season coming to terms with arguably the heaviest punishment ever handed out to an English club. As punishment for financial irregularities committed under the club's previous owners during the 1980s, they were fined £600,000 and were docked 12 league points as well as being banned from the 1994-95 FA Cup. Manager Ossie Ardiles reacted defiantly by adopting an impressive new attacking formation, while chairman Alan Sugar challenged his club's sanctions in court. The fine was later increased to £1.5 million, but the points deduction and FA Cup ban were eventually revoked (Swindon Town, who had won promotion under Ardiles to the top flight in the 1990 play-offs, were initially relegated to the Third Division for illegal payments to players, before being allowed to stay in the Second).

On the field, the new ultra-attacking style of football was not bringing as much success as Ardiles might have liked and in November he paid for these shortcomings with his job, following a 3–0 defeat in the League Cup to Notts County. QPR manager Gerry Francis was named as his successor, and guided Spurs to seventh in the final table – their highest finish for five years. He also took them to the semi-finals of the FA Cup, where they were beaten 4–1 by Everton.

The close season saw 30-goal striker, and FWA Player of the Year, Jürgen Klinsmann return to his homeland in a £1.5million move to Bayern Munich, and in came Chris Armstrong from Crystal Palace as his replacement. At a club record fee of £4.5million 24-year-old Armstrong was slammed as a "waste of money" by many supporters, who were sceptical of such a large sum of money being spent on a player who had scored just nine league goals (although his tally for 1994–95 reached 19 thanks to Palace's cup exploits), seen his old club relegated and failed a drugs test.

Gheorghe Popescu and Nick Barmby also moved on at the end of the season, leaving Francis to re-organise in midfield.

== Final league table ==
Pos	Team	Pld	W	D	L	GF	GA	GD	Pts	Qualification or relegation
5	Leeds United	42	20	13	9	59	38	+21	73	Qualification for the UEFA Cup first round (Note: Leeds United were rewarded entry to the UEFA Cup through UEFA Fair Play ranking.)
6	Newcastle United	42	20	12	10	67	47	+20	72	
7	Tottenham Hotspur	42	16	14	12	66	58	+8	62	Qualification for the Intertoto Cup group stage
8	Queens Park Rangers	42	17	9	16	61	59	+2	60	
9	Wimbledon	42	15	11	16	48	65	−17	56	Qualification for the Intertoto Cup group stage

Source: Premier League
Rules for classification: 1) points; 2) goal difference; 3) number of goals scored.
Notes:

Results summary

Overall								Home						Away					
Pld	W	D	L	GF	GA	GD	Pts	W	D	L	GF	GA	GD	W	D	L	GF	GA	GD
42	16	14	12	66	58	+8	62	10	5	6	32	25	+7	6	9	6	34	33	+1

Source: Statto

Results by matchday

Match	1	2	3	4	5	6	7	8	9	10	11	12	13	14	15	16	17	18	19	20	21	22	23	24	25	26	27	28	29	30	31	32	33	34	35	36	37	38	39	40	41	42
Ground	A	H	H	A	H	A	H	A	H	A	A	H	A	H	H	A	H	H	A	A	H	A	H	A	A	H	A	H	A	H	A	H	H	A	H	A	H	A	A	A	H	H
Result	W	W	L	W	L	L	L	W	D	D	L	W	L	L	D	D	W	W	D	W	D	W	W	W	L	W	D	L	D	W	D	W	D	L	W	D	W	D	D	L	L	D
Position	5	2	7	3	9	9	12	10	10	12	13	11	13	15	14	14	11	10	10	8	8	6	6	6	6	6	6	7	6	6	7	7	7	7	7	7	7	7	7	7	7	7

Source: Statto.com
A = Away; H = Home; W = Win; D = Draw; L = Loss

== Results ==
Tottenham Hotspur's score comes first

=== Legend ===
Win	Draw	Loss

=== FA Premier League ===
Date	Opponent	Venue	Result	Attendance	Scorers
20 August 1994	Sheffield Wednesday	A	4–3	34,051	Sheringham, Anderton, Barmby, Klinsmann
24 August 1994	Everton	H	2–1	24,553	Klinsmann (2)
27 August 1994	Manchester United	H	0–1	24,502	
30 August 1994	Ipswich Town	A	3–1	22,559	Klinsmann (2), Dumitrescu
12 September 1994	Southampton	H	1–2	22,387	Klinsmann
17 September 1994	Leicester City	A	1–3	21,300	Klinsmann
24 September 1994	Nottingham Forest	H	1–4	24,558	Dumitrescu
1 October 1994	Wimbledon	A	2–1	16,802	Sheringham, Popescu
8 October 1994	Queens Park Rangers	H	1–1	25,799	Barmby
15 October 1994	Leeds United	A	1–1	39,362	Sheringham
22 October 1994	Manchester City	A	2–5	25,473	Dumitrescu (2, 1 pen)
29 October 1994	West Ham United	H	3–1	26,271	Klinsmann, Sheringham, Barmby
5 November 1994	Blackburn Rovers	A	0–2	26,933	
19 November 1994	Aston Villa	H	3–4	26,889	Sheringham, Klinsmann, Bosnich (own goal)
23 November 1994	Chelsea	H	0–0	27,037	
26 November 1994	Liverpool	A	1–1	35,007	Ruddock (own goal)
3 December 1994	Newcastle United	H	4–2	28,002	Sheringham (3), Popescu
10 December 1994	Sheffield Wednesday	H	3–1	25,912	Barmby, Klinsmann, Calderwood
17 December 1994	Everton	A	0–0	32,813	
26 December 1994	Norwich City	A	2–0	21,814	Barmby, Sheringham
27 December 1994	Crystal Palace	H	0–0	27,730	
31 December 1994	Coventry City	A	4–0	25,659	Darby (own goal), Barmby, Anderton, Sheringham
2 January 1995	Arsenal	H	1–0	28,747	Popescu
14 January 1995	West Ham United	A	2–1	24,578	Sheringham, Klinsmann
25 January 1995	Aston Villa	A	0–1	40,017	
5 February 1995	Blackburn Rovers	H	3–1	28,124	Klinsmann, Anderton, Barmby
11 February 1995	Chelsea	A	1–1	30,812	Sheringham
25 February 1995	Wimbledon	H	1–2	27,258	Klinsmann
4 March 1995	Nottingham Forest	A	2–2	28,711	Sheringham, Calderwood
8 March 1995	Ipswich Town	H	3–0	24,930	Klinsmann, Barmby, Youds (own goal)
15 March 1995	Manchester United	A	0–0	43,802	
18 March 1995	Leicester City	H	1–0	30,851	Klinsmann
22 March 1995	Liverpool	H	0–0	31,988	
2 April 1995	Southampton	A	3–4	15,105	Sheringham (2), Klinsmann
11 April 1995	Manchester City	H	2–1	27,410	Howells, Klinsmann
14 April 1995	Crystal Palace	A	1–1	18,068	Klinsmann
17 April 1995	Norwich City	H	1–0	32,304	Sheringham
29 April 1995	Arsenal	A	1–1	38,377	Klinsmann
3 May 1995	Newcastle United	A	3–3	35,603	Barmby, Klinsmann, Anderton
6 May 1995	Queens Park Rangers	A	1–2	18,637	Sheringham
9 May 1995	Coventry City	H	1–3	24,930	Anderton
14 May 1995	Leeds United	H	1–1	33,040	Sheringham

=== FA Cup ===
Round	Date	Opponent	Venue	Result	Attendance	Goalscorers
R3	7 January 1995	Altrincham	H	3–0	25,057	Sheringham, Rosenthal, Nethercott
R4	29 January 1995	Sunderland	A	4–1	21,135	Klinsmann (2, 1 pen), Sheringham, Melville (own goal)
R5	18 February 1995	Southampton	H	1–1	28,091	Klinsmann
R5R	1 March 1995	Southampton	A	6–2 (a.e.t.)	15,172	Rosenthal (3), Sheringham, Barmby, Anderton
QF	11 March 1995	Liverpool	A	2–1	39,582	Sheringham, Klinsmann
SF	9 April 1995	Everton	N	1–4	38,226	Klinsmann (pen)

=== League Cup ===
Round	Date	Opponent	Venue	Result	Attendance	Goalscorers
R2 1st Leg	21 September 1994	Watford	A	6–3	13,659	Anderton, Klinsmann (3), Sheringham, Dumitrescu
R2 2nd Leg	4 October 1994	Watford	H	2–3 (won 8–6 on agg)	17,798	Barmby, Klinsmann
R3	26 October 1994	Notts County	A	0–3	13,952	

== Squad ==
Note: Flags indicate national team as defined under FIFA eligibility rules; some limited exceptions apply. Players may hold more than one non-FIFA nationality.

No.	Pos.	Nation	Player
1	GK	NOR	Erik Thorstvedt
2	DF	ENG	Dean Austin
3	DF	ENG	Justin Edinburgh
4	MF	ROU	Gheorghe Popescu
5	DF	SCO	Colin Calderwood
6	DF	ENG	Gary Mabbutt
7	MF	ENG	Nick Barmby
8	FW	ROU	Ilie Dumitrescu
9	MF	ENG	Darren Anderton
10	FW	ENG	Teddy Sheringham
11	FW	ISR	Ronny Rosenthal
12	MF	ENG	Jason Dozzell
13	GK	ENG	Ian Walker
14	DF	ENG	Stuart Nethercott
15	MF	ENG	David Howells

No.	Pos.	Nation	Player
17	MF	IRL	Andy Turner
18	FW	GER	Jürgen Klinsmann
19	DF	ENG	Kevin Scott
20	MF	ENG	Darren Caskey
21	MF	ENG	Danny Hill
22	DF	ENG	David Kerslake
23	DF	ENG	Sol Campbell
24	FW	ENG	Paul Mahorn
25	FW	SCO	John Hendry
26	DF	ENG	Jason Cundy
27	DF	IRL	Stephen Carr
28	MF	NIR	Gerry McMahon
30	GK	ENG	Chris Day
31	FW	ENG	Robert Simpson

=== Left club during season ===
Note: Flags indicate national team as defined under FIFA eligibility rules; some limited exceptions apply. Players may hold more than one non-FIFA nationality.

No. / Pos. / Nation / Player; 16 / MF / ENG / Micky Hazard (retired)	No. / Pos. / Nation / Player; 29 / MF / NIR / Steve Robinson (to Bournemouth)

=== Reserve squad ===
Note: Flags indicate national team as defined under FIFA eligibility rules; some limited exceptions apply. Players may hold more than one non-FIFA nationality.

No.	Pos.	Nation	Player
—	DF	ENG	Jamie Clapham
—	DF	IRL	Owen Coll
—	DF	ENG	Leon Townley
—	MF	SCO	Garry Brady

No.	Pos.	Nation	Player
—	MF	ENG	Stephen Clemence
—	MF	ENG	Kevin Watson
—	FW	ENG	Steve Slade

== Transfers ==
=== In ===
Date	Pos	Name	From	Fee
1 July 1994	DF	(Republic of Ireland) Owen Coll	(England) Enfield	Free
3 August 1994	FW	(Germany) Jürgen Klinsmann	(France) Monaco	£2,300,000
3 August 1994	FW	(Romania) Ilie Dumitrescu	(Romania) Steaua București	£2,600,000
12 August 1994	MF	(Romania) Gheorghe Popescu	(Netherlands) PSV Eindhoven	£2,900,000

=== Out ===
Date	Pos	Name	To	Fee
31 May 1994	MF	(England) Lee Hodges	(England) Barnet	Free transfer
31 May 1994	MF	(England) Andy Gray	(Spain) CA Marbella	Signed
15 June 1994	MF	(England) Steve Sedgley	(England) Ipswich Town	£1,000,000
12 July 1994	GK	(England) Andy Quy	(England) Derby County	Free transfer
13 July 1994	FW	(South Africa) Glynn Hurst	(England) Barnsley	Free transfer
13 July 1994	MF	(England) Neil Le Bihan	(England) Peterborough United	Free transfer
25 July 1994	MF	(England) Jeff Minton	(England) Brighton & Hove Albion	Free transfer
2 August 1994	DF	(England) Ijah Anderson	(England) Southend United	Free transfer
2 August 1994	MF	(England) Vinny Samways	(England) Everton	£2,200,000
12 September 1994	FW	(England) Peter Beadle	(England) Watford	Signed
11 October 1994	DF	(England) Neil Young	(England) Bournemouth	Free transfer
20 October 1994	MF	(Northern Ireland) Steve Robinson	(England) Bournemouth	Free transfer
21 March 1995	DF	(Iceland) Guðni Bergsson	(England) Bolton Wanderers	£65,000

Transfers in: ▼£7,500,000
Transfers out: ▲£3,265,000
Total spending: ▼£4,235,000

== Statistics ==
=== Appearances and goals ===
No.	Pos	Nat	Player	Total		Premier League		FA Cup		League Cup	
No.	Pos	Nat	Player	Apps	Goals	Apps	Goals	Apps	Goals	Apps	Goals
13	GK	(England) ENG	Ian Walker	49	0	41	0	6	0	2	0
23	DF	(England) ENG	Sol Campbell	36	0	29+1	0	3	0	3	0
5	DF	(Scotland) SCO	Colin Calderwood	43	2	35+1	2	6	0	1	0
6	DF	(England) ENG	Gary Mabbutt	44	0	33+3	0	6	0	2	0
3	DF	(England) ENG	Justin Edinburgh	37	0	29+2	0	4	0	2	0
9	MF	(England) ENG	Darren Anderton	45	7	37	5	6	1	2	1
4	MF	(Romania) ROU	Gheorghe Popescu	28	3	23	3	3	0	2	0
7	MF	(England) ENG	Nick Barmby	46	11	37+1	9	6	1	2	1
15	MF	(England) ENG	David Howells	34	1	26	1	6	0	1+1	0
10	FW	(England) ENG	Teddy Sheringham	50	23	41+1	18	6	4	2	1
18	FW	(Germany) GER	Jürgen Klinsmann	50	29	41	20	6	5	3	4
1	GK	(Norway) NOR	Erik Thorstvedt	2	0	1	0	0	0	1	0
2	DF	(England) ENG	Dean Austin	31	0	23+1	0	4+1	0	2	0
22	DF	(England) ENG	David Kerslake	20	0	16+2	0	0	0	2	0
11	FW	(Israel) ISR	Ronny Rosenthal	25	4	14+6	0	2+2	4	1	0
8	FW	(Romania) ROU	Ilie Dumitrescu	15	5	11+2	4	0	0	2	1
14	DF	(England) ENG	Stuart Nethercott	21	1	8+9	0	2+2	1	0	0
12	MF	(England) ENG	Jason Dozzell	9	0	6+1	0	0	0	2	0
19	DF	(England) ENG	Kevin Scott	4	0	4	0	0	0	0	0
28	MF	(Northern Ireland) NIR	Gerry McMahon	2	0	2	0	0	0	0	0
20	MF	(England) ENG	Darren Caskey	5	0	1+3	0	0+1	0	0	0
21	MF	(England) ENG	Danny Hill	5	0	1+2	0	0	0	0+2	0
17	MF	(Republic of Ireland) IRL	Andy Turner	1	0	1	0	0	0	0	0
Players transferred out during the season
16	MF	(England) ENG	Micky Hazard	13	0	2+9	0	0	0	1+1	0

Last updated: 15 May 1999

=== Goal scorers ===
Last updated: 26 July 2020.
Source: premierleague.com

The list is sorted by shirt number when total goals are equal.

Rnk	Pos	No.	Player	Premier League	FA Cup	EFL Cup	Total
1	FW	18	(Germany) Jürgen Klinsmann	20	5	4	29
2	FW	10	(England) Teddy Sheringham	18	4	1	23
3	MF	7	(England) Nick Barmby	9	1	1	11
4	MF	9	(England) Darren Anderton	5	1	1	7
5	FW	8	(Romania) Ilie Dumitrescu	4	0	1	5
6	FW	11	(Israel) Ronny Rosenthal	0	4	0	4
7	MF	4	(Romania) Gheorghe Popescu	3	0	0	3
8	DF	5	(Scotland) Colin Calderwood	2	0	0	2
9	DF	14	(England) Stuart Nethercott	0	1	0	1
9	MF	15	(England) David Howells	1	0	0	1
TOTALS				62	16	8	86

=== Clean sheets ===
Last updated: 26 July 2020.
Source: premierleague.com

Rnk	No.	Player	Premier League	FA Cup	EFL Cup	Total
1	1	(England) Ian Walker	11	1	0	12
TOTALS			11	1	0	12
