= 1995–96 Tottenham Hotspur F.C. season =

English football club season

Tottenham Hotspur F.C.
1995–96 season
- Chairman: Alan Sugar
- Manager: Gerry Francis
- Stadium: White Hart Lane
- Premier League: 8th
- FA Cup: Fifth round
- League Cup: Third round
- UEFA Intertoto Cup: Group stage
- Top goalscorer: League: Teddy Sheringham (16); All: Teddy Sheringham (24)
- Highest home attendance: 32,918 vs Chelsea (27 April 1996, FA Premier League)
- Lowest home attendance: 17,645 vs Chester City (20 September 1995, League Cup)
- Average home league attendance: 30,510
| Home colours | Away colours | Third colours |

The 1995–96 season was Tottenham Hotspur's 114th season in their history, 18th successive season in the top flight of English football and the 4th season in the FA Premier League. In addition to the domestic league, the club also participated in that season's FA Cup and League Cup.

== Season summary ==
The sale of key players Jürgen Klinsmann, Gheorghe Popescu and Nick Barmby weakened Tottenham's resources for 1995–96, and manager Gerry Francis was faced with taunts of "what a waste of money" from shocked supporters when he paid a club record £4.5million for Crystal Palace striker Chris Armstrong.

But Armstrong quickly formed an effective strikeforce with Teddy Sheringham, and an eighth-place finish in the final table was only one place lower than last season's final position - though it was once again not quite enough for a UEFA Cup place.

Perhaps the best moment of the season came on New Year's Day when Spurs triumphed 4–1 at home to Manchester United, dealing a serious blow to the visiting side's title hopes and boosting their own hopes of qualifying for the UEFA Cup as they muscled in on the top five. While Spurs failed to live up to the promise that the game delivered, the losing side lost only one more league game all season and won the league title which had looked an impossible job a few short months earlier.

Early in the season, Tottenham (and London rivals Wimbledon) were informed that they would be banned from European competition by UEFA for the 1996–97 season, for fielding weakened teams in the pre-season UEFA Intertoto Cup. The ban was lifted on appeal.

== Final league table ==
| Pos | Team | Pld | W | D | L | GF | GA | GD | Pts | Qualification or relegation |
|---|---|---|---|---|---|---|---|---|---|---|
| 6 | Everton | 38 | 17 | 10 | 11 | 64 | 44 | +20 | 61 | Excluded from the UEFA Cup (Note: The Football Association was initially awarded a UEFA Fair Play berth to the Premier League's highest-placed team not qualified for Europe, but was revoked by UEFA for its clubs fielding under-strength sides in the 1995 UEFA Intertoto Cup.) |
| 7 | Blackburn Rovers | 38 | 18 | 7 | 13 | 61 | 47 | +14 | 61 | |
| 8 | Tottenham Hotspur | 38 | 16 | 13 | 9 | 50 | 38 | +12 | 61 | |
| 9 | Nottingham Forest | 38 | 15 | 13 | 10 | 50 | 54 | −4 | 58 | |
| 10 | West Ham United | 38 | 14 | 9 | 15 | 43 | 52 | −9 | 51 | |

Source: Premier League
Rules for classification: 1) points; 2) goal difference; 3) number of goals scored.

== Results ==
Tottenham Hotspur's score comes first

=== Legend ===
| Win | Draw | Loss |

=== FA Premier League ===
| Date | Opponent | Venue | Result | Attendance | Scorers |
|---|---|---|---|---|---|
| 19 August 1995 | Manchester City | A | 1–1 | 30,827 | Sheringham |
| 23 August 1995 | Aston Villa | H | 0–1 | 26,726 | |
| 26 August 1995 | Liverpool | H | 1–3 | 31,254 | Barnes (own goal) |
| 30 August 1995 | West Ham United | A | 1–1 | 23,516 | Rosenthal |
| 9 September 1995 | Leeds United | H | 2–1 | 30,034 | Howells, Sheringham |
| 16 September 1995 | Sheffield Wednesday | A | 3–1 | 26,565 | Sheringham (2, 1 pen), D Walker (own goal) |
| 25 September 1995 | Queens Park Rangers | A | 3–2 | 15,659 | Sheringham (2, 1 pen), Dozzell |
| 30 September 1995 | Wimbledon | H | 3–1 | 25,321 | Sheringham (2), Elkins (own goal) |
| 14 October 1995 | Nottingham Forest | H | 0–1 | 32,876 | |
| 22 October 1995 | Everton | A | 1–1 | 33,629 | Armstrong |
| 29 October 1995 | Newcastle United | H | 1–1 | 32,279 | Armstrong |
| 4 November 1995 | Coventry City | A | 3–2 | 17,545 | Fox, Sheringham, Howells |
| 18 November 1995 | Arsenal | H | 2–1 | 32,894 | Sheringham, Armstrong |
| 21 November 1995 | Middlesbrough | A | 1–0 | 29,487 | Armstrong |
| 25 November 1995 | Chelsea | A | 0–0 | 31,059 | |
| 2 December 1995 | Everton | H | 0–0 | 32,894 | |
| 9 December 1995 | Queens Park Rangers | H | 1–0 | 28,851 | Sheringham |
| 16 December 1995 | Wimbledon | A | 1–0 | 16,193 | Fox |
| 23 December 1995 | Bolton Wanderers | H | 2–2 | 30,702 | Sheringham, Armstrong |
| 26 December 1995 | Southampton | A | 0–0 | 15,238 | |
| 30 December 1995 | Blackburn Rovers | A | 1–2 | 30,004 | Sheringham |
| 1 January 1996 | Manchester United | H | 4–1 | 32,852 | Sheringham, Campbell, Armstrong (2) |
| 13 January 1996 | Manchester City | H | 1–0 | 31,438 | Armstrong |
| 21 January 1996 | Aston Villa | A | 1–2 | 35,666 | Fox |
| 3 February 1996 | Liverpool | A | 0–0 | 40,628 | |
| 12 February 1996 | West Ham United | H | 0–1 | 29,781 | |
| 24 February 1996 | Sheffield Wednesday | H | 1–0 | 32,047 | Armstrong |
| 2 March 1996 | Southampton | H | 1–0 | 26,320 | Dozzell |
| 16 March 1996 | Blackburn Rovers | H | 2–3 | 32,387 | Sheringham, Armstrong |
| 20 March 1996 | Bolton Wanderers | A | 3–2 | 17,829 | Howells, Fox, Armstrong |
| 24 March 1996 | Manchester United | A | 0–1 | 50,157 | |
| 30 March 1996 | Coventry City | H | 3–1 | 26,808 | Sheringham, Fox (2) |
| 6 April 1996 | Nottingham Forest | A | 1–2 | 27,053 | Armstrong |
| 8 April 1996 | Middlesbrough | H | 1–1 | 32,036 | Armstrong |
| 15 April 1996 | Arsenal | A | 0–0 | 38,273 | |
| 27 April 1996 | Chelsea | H | 1–1 | 32,918 | Armstrong |
| 2 May 1996 | Leeds United | A | 3–1 | 30,061 | Armstrong, Anderton (2) |
| 5 May 1996 | Newcastle United | A | 1–1 | 36,589 | Dozzell |

=== FA Cup ===
| Round | Date | Opponent | Venue | Result | Attendance | Goalscorers |
|---|---|---|---|---|---|---|
| R3 | 6 January 1996 | Hereford United | A | 1–1 | 8,806 | Rosenthal |
| R3R | 17 January 1996 | Hereford United | H | 5–1 | 31,534 | Sheringham (3), Armstrong (2) |
| R4 | 27 January 1996 | Wolverhampton Wanderers | H | 1–1 | 32,812 | Wilson |
| R4R | 7 February 1996 | Wolverhampton Wanderers | A | 2–0 | 27,846 | Rosenthal, Sheringham |
| R5 | 28 February 1996 | Nottingham Forest | A | 2–2 | 18,600 | Armstrong (2) |
| R5R | 9 March 1996 | Nottingham Forest | H | 1–1 (lost 1–3 on pens) | 31,055 | Sheringham |

=== League Cup ===
| Round | Date | Opponent | Venue | Result | Attendance | Goalscorers |
|---|---|---|---|---|---|---|
| R2 1st Leg | 20 September 1995 | Chester City | H | 4–0 | 17,645 | Armstrong (2), Rosenthal, Sheringham |
| R2 2nd Leg | 4 October 1995 | Chester City | A | 3–1 (won 7–1 on agg) | 5,372 | Sheringham (2), Howells |
| R3 | 25 October 1995 | Coventry City | A | 2–3 | 18,227 | Busst (own goal), Armstrong |

=== UEFA Intertoto Cup ===
| Round | Date | Opponent | Venue | Result | Attendance | Goalscorers |
|---|---|---|---|---|---|---|
| Group 2 | 25 June 1995 | Luzern | H | 0–2 | 2,497 | |
| Group 2 | 1 July 1995 | Rudar Velenje | A | 2–1 | 2,000 | Sampson, Hendry |
| Group 2 | 15 July 1995 | Öster | H | 1–2 | 2,143 | McMahon |
| Group 2 | 22 July 1995 | Köln | A | 0–8 | 6,100 | |

Note: Home games in the UEFA Intertoto Cup were played at the Goldstone Ground due to unavailability of White Hart Lane

== Squad ==
Squad at end of season

Note: Flags indicate national team as defined under FIFA eligibility rules; some limited exceptions apply. Players may hold more than one non-FIFA nationality.

| No. | Pos. | Nation | Player |
|---|---|---|---|
| 1 | GK | ENG | Ian Walker |
| 2 | DF | ENG | Dean Austin |
| 3 | DF | ENG | Justin Edinburgh |
| 4 | MF | ENG | David Howells |
| 5 | DF | SCO | Colin Calderwood |
| 6 | DF | ENG | Gary Mabbutt (captain) |
| 7 | MF | MSR | Ruel Fox |
| 9 | MF | ENG | Darren Anderton |
| 10 | FW | ENG | Teddy Sheringham |
| 11 | FW | ENG | Chris Armstrong |
| 12 | MF | ENG | Jason Dozzell |
| 13 | GK | NOR | Erik Thorstvedt |
| 14 | DF | ENG | Stuart Nethercott |
| 15 | DF | ENG | Clive Wilson |

| No. | Pos. | Nation | Player |
|---|---|---|---|
| 16 | FW | ISR | Ronny Rosenthal |
| 17 | MF | ENG | Andy Turner |
| 18 | MF | NIR | Gerry McMahon |
| 19 | DF | ENG | Kevin Scott |
| 21 | MF | ENG | Danny Hill |
| 22 | DF | ENG | David Kerslake |
| 23 | DF | ENG | Sol Campbell |
| 24 | DF | ENG | Jason Cundy |
| 25 | DF | IRL | Stephen Carr |
| 26 | FW | ENG | Paul Mahorn |
| 27 | MF | ENG | Andy Sinton |
| 28 | MF | ENG | Kevin Watson |
| 29 | FW | ENG | Steve Slade |
| 30 | GK | ENG | Chris Day |

=== Left club during season ===
Note: Flags indicate national team as defined under FIFA eligibility rules; some limited exceptions apply. Players may hold more than one non-FIFA nationality.

| No. / Pos. / Nation / Player; 8 / FW / ROU / Ilie Dumitrescu (to West Ham United) | No. / Pos. / Nation / Player; 20 / MF / ENG / Darren Caskey (to Reading) |

=== UEFA Intertoto Cup squad ===
Tottenham used a squad of loan players and reserve team players while competing in the UEFA Intertoto Cup.

Note: Flags indicate national team as defined under FIFA eligibility rules; some limited exceptions apply. Players may hold more than one non-FIFA nationality.

| No. | Pos. | Nation | Player |
|---|---|---|---|
| — | GK | ENG | Simon Brown |
| — | GK | ENG | Chris Day |
| — | DF | ENG | David Byrne (on loan from St Mirren) |
| — | DF | ENG | Jamie Clapham |
| — | DF | IRL | Stephen Carr |
| — | DF | IRL | Owen Coll |
| — | DF | ENG | Mark Newson (on loan from Barnet) |
| — | DF | ENG | Leon Townley |
| — | MF | ENG | Alan Pardew (on loan from Charlton Athletic) |
| — | MF | ENG | Ian Sampson (on loan from Northampton Town) |

| No. | Pos. | Nation | Player |
|---|---|---|---|
| — | MF | ENG | Robbie Simpson |
| — | MF | ENG | Simon Spencer |
| — | MF | ENG | Andy Turner |
| — | MF | ENG | Simon Wormull |
| — | MF | ENG | Kevin Watson |
| — | MF | NIR | Gerry McMahon |
| — | FW | ENG | Paul Mahorn |
| — | FW | ENG | Steve Slade |
| — | FW | SCO | John Hendry |

=== Reserve squad ===
Note: Flags indicate national team as defined under FIFA eligibility rules; some limited exceptions apply. Players may hold more than one non-FIFA nationality.

| No. | Pos. | Nation | Player |
|---|---|---|---|
| — | MF | ENG | Stephen Clemence |
| — | MF | ENG | Kevin Maher |

| No. | Pos. | Nation | Player |
|---|---|---|---|
| — | MF | SCO | Garry Brady |
| — | FW | ENG | Neale Fenn |

== Transfers ==
=== In ===
| Date | Pos | Name | From | Fee |
|---|---|---|---|---|
| 12 June 1995 | DF | (England) Clive Wilson | (England) QPR | Free transfer |
| 30 June 1995 | FW | (England) Chris Armstrong | (England) Crystal Palace | £4,500,000 |
| 6 October 1995 | MF | (Montserrat) Ruel Fox | (England) Newcastle United | £4,200,000 |
| 23 January 1996 | MF | (England) Andy Sinton | (England) Sheffield Wednesday | £1,500,000 |

=== Out ===
| Date | Pos | Name | To | Fee |
|---|---|---|---|---|
| 22 May 1995 | MF | (Romania) Gheorghe Popescu | (Spain) Barcelona | £2,800,000 |
| 1 July 1995 | F | (Germany) Jürgen Klinsmann | (Germany) FC Bayern Munich | €1,400,000 |
| 11 July 1995 | FW | (Scotland) John Hendry | (Scotland) Motherwell | £200,000 |
| 8 August 1995 | MF | (England) Nick Barmby | (England) Middlesbrough | £5,250,000 |
| 28 February 1996 | MF | (England) Darren Caskey | (England) Reading | £700,000 |
| 9 March 1996 | FW | (Romania) Ilie Dumitrescu | (England) West Ham United | £1,500,000 |
| 27 March 1996 | DF | (Republic of Ireland) Owen Coll | (England) Bournemouth | Signed |

Transfers in: ▼£10,200,000
Transfers out: ▲£11,647,000
Total spending: ▲£1,447,420

== Statistics ==
=== Appearances and goals ===
| No. | Pos | Nat | Player | Total | | FA Premier League | | FA Cup | | League Cup | |
| No. | Pos | Nat | Player | Apps | Goals | Apps | Goals | Apps | Goals | Apps | Goals |
Goalkeepers
| 1 | GK | (England) ENG | Ian Walker | 47 | 0 | 38 | 0 | 6 | 0 | 3 | 0 |
Defenders
| 2 | DF | (England) ENG | Dean Austin | 35 | 0 | 28 | 0 | 4 | 0 | 3 | 0 |
| 3 | DF | (England) ENG | Justin Edinburgh | 28 | 0 | 15+7 | 0 | 4 | 0 | 1+1 | 0 |
| 5 | DF | (Scotland) SCO | Colin Calderwood | 36 | 0 | 26+3 | 0 | 4 | 0 | 3 | 0 |
| 6 | DF | (England) ENG | Gary Mabbutt | 41 | 0 | 32 | 0 | 6 | 0 | 3 | 0 |
| 14 | DF | (England) ENG | Stuart Nethercott | 16 | 0 | 9+4 | 0 | 2+1 | 0 | 0 | 0 |
| 15 | DF | (England) ENG | Clive Wilson | 36 | 1 | 28 | 0 | 4+1 | 1 | 3 | 0 |
| 19 | DF | (England) ENG | Kevin Scott | 3 | 0 | 0+2 | 0 | 0 | 0 | 0+1 | 0 |
| 22 | DF | (England) ENG | David Kerslake | 2 | 0 | 2 | 0 | 0 | 0 | 0 | 0 |
| 23 | DF | (England) ENG | Sol Campbell | 39 | 1 | 31 | 1 | 6 | 0 | 2 | 0 |
| 24 | DF | (England) ENG | Jason Cundy | 1 | 0 | 0+1 | 0 | 0 | 0 | 0 | 0 |
Midfielders
| 4 | MF | (England) ENG | David Howells | 33 | 4 | 29 | 3 | 2 | 0 | 2 | 1 |
| 7 | MF | (Montserrat) MSR | Ruel Fox | 32 | 6 | 26 | 6 | 6 | 0 | 0 | 0 |
| 9 | MF | (England) ENG | Darren Anderton | 9 | 2 | 6+2 | 2 | 0 | 0 | 1 | 0 |
| 12 | MF | (England) ENG | Jason Dozzell | 34 | 3 | 24+4 | 3 | 2+1 | 0 | 1+2 | 0 |
| 18 | MF | (Northern Ireland) NIR | Gerry McMahon | 18 | 0 | 7+7 | 0 | 0+1 | 0 | 3 | 0 |
| 27 | MF | (England) ENG | Andy Sinton | 9 | 0 | 8+1 | 0 | 0 | 0 | 0 | 0 |
Forwards
| 10 | FW | (England) ENG | Teddy Sheringham | 47 | 24 | 38 | 16 | 6 | 5 | 3 | 3 |
| 11 | FW | (England) ENG | Chris Armstrong | 45 | 22 | 36 | 15 | 6 | 4 | 3 | 3 |
| 16 | FW | (Israel) ISR | Ronny Rosenthal | 40 | 4 | 26+7 | 1 | 5 | 2 | 2 | 1 |
| 29 | FW | (England) ENG | Steve Slade | 8 | 0 | 1+4 | 0 | 0+2 | 0 | 0+1 | 0 |
Players transferred out during the season
| 8 | MF | (Romania) ROU | Ilie Dumitrescu | 5 | 0 | 5 | 0 | 0 | 0 | 0 | 0 |
| 20 | MF | (England) ENG | Darren Caskey | 6 | 0 | 3 | 0 | 3 | 0 | 0 | 0 |

Last updated: 15 May 1999
Source: [[]]

=== Goal scorers ===
Last updated: 26 July 2020.
Source: premierleague.com

The list is sorted by shirt number when total goals are equal.

| Rnk | Pos | No. | Player | FA Premier League | FA Cup | League Cup | Total |
|---|---|---|---|---|---|---|---|
| 1 | FW | 10 | (England) Teddy Sheringham | 16 | 5 | 3 | 24 |
| 2 | FW | 11 | (England) Chris Armstrong | 15 | 4 | 3 | 22 |
| 3 | FW | 7 | (Montserrat) Ruel Fox | 6 | 0 | 0 | 6 |
| 4 | MF | 4 | (England) David Howells | 3 | 0 | 1 | 4 |
| 4 | FW | 16 | (Israel) Ronny Rosenthal | 1 | 2 | 1 | 4 |
| 6 | MF | 12 | (England) Jason Dozzell | 3 | 0 | 0 | 3 |
| 7 | MF | 9 | (England) Darren Anderton | 2 | 0 | 0 | 2 |
| 8 | DF | 15 | (England) Clive Wilson | 0 | 1 | 0 | 1 |
| 8 | DF | 23 | (England) Sol Campbell | 1 | 0 | 0 | 1 |
| TOTALS | | | | 47 | 12 | 8 | 67 |

=== Clean sheets ===
Last updated: 26 July 2020.
Source: premierleague.com

| Rnk | No. | Player | FA Premier League | FA Cup | League Cup | Total |
|---|---|---|---|---|---|---|
| 1 | 1 | (England) Ian Walker | 11 | 1 | 1 | 13 |
| TOTALS | | | 11 | 1 | 1 | 13 |
