= Sol Campbell =

English footballer and manager (born 1974)

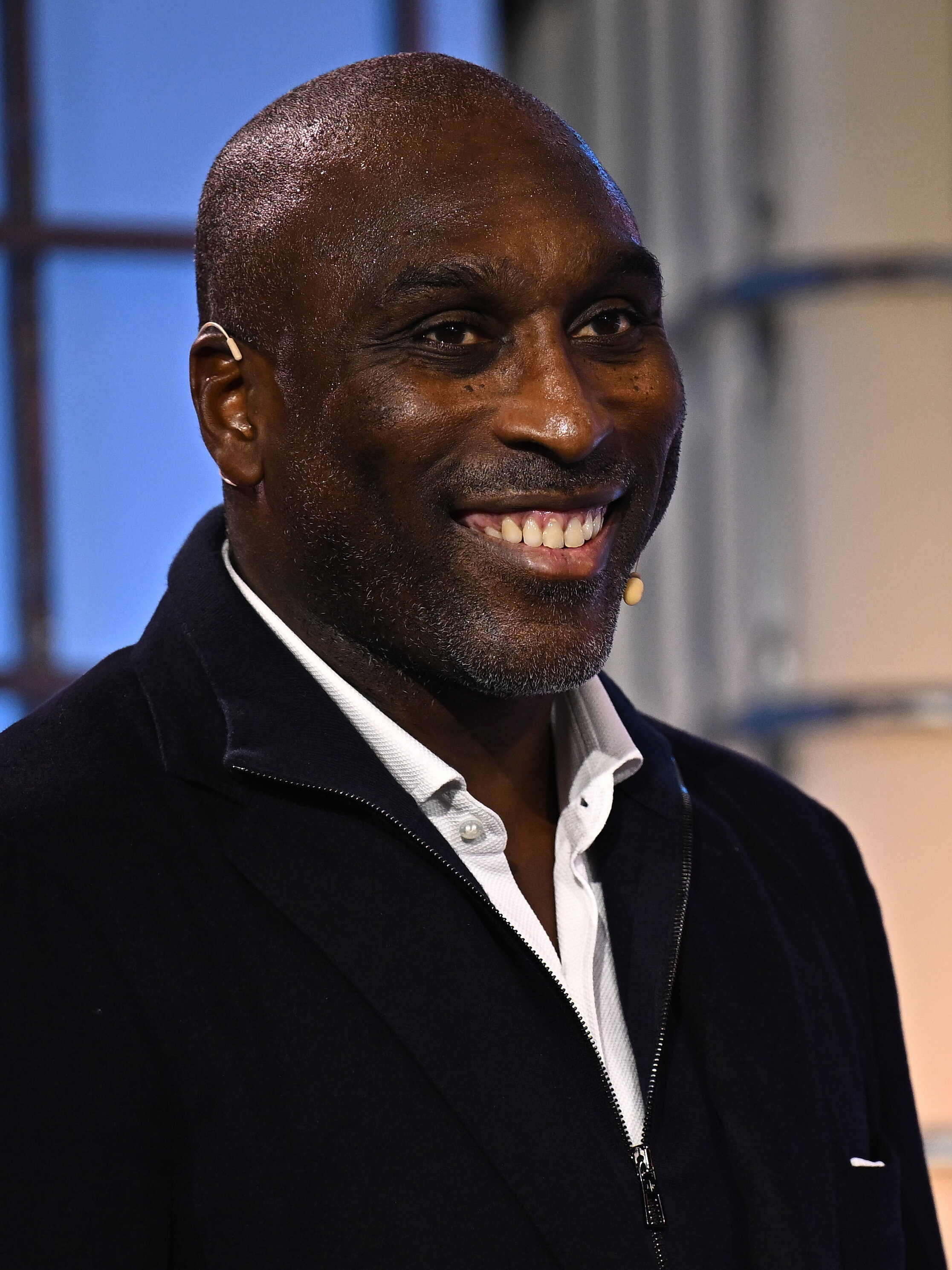
- Campbell in 2025

Personal information
- Full name: Sulzeer Jeremiah Campbell
- Date of birth: 18 September 1974 (age 52)
- Place of birth: Plaistow, London, England
- Height: 6 ft 2 in (1.88 m)
- Position: Centre-back

Youth career
- 1988–1989: West Ham United
- 1989–1992: Tottenham Hotspur

Senior career*
Years	Team	Apps	(Gls)
1992–2001	Tottenham Hotspur	255	(10)
2001–2006	Arsenal	135	(8)
2006–2009	Portsmouth	95	(2)
2009	Notts County	1	(0)
2010	Arsenal	11	(0)
2010–2011	Newcastle United	7	(0)
Total		504	(20)

International career
- England U15
- England U16
- England U18
1994–1996	England U21	11	(2)
1994–2006	England B	2	(0)
1996–2007	England	73	(1)

Managerial career
- 2018–2019: Macclesfield Town
- 2019–2020: Southend United
- * Club domestic league appearances and goals

Sulzeer Jeremiah "Sol" Campbell (born 18 September 1974) is an English professional football manager and former player. He spent 20 years playing in the Premier League and had a 12-year international career with the England national team.

Born in East London to Jamaican parents, Campbell began his career with Tottenham Hotspur in December 1992. He spent nine years at Spurs, scoring 15 goals in 315 appearances, and was appointed club captain in 1997, leading the team to victory in the 1999 Football League Cup final against Leicester City. In 2001, he joined Tottenham's North London rivals Arsenal on a free transfer, and as a result has remained a deeply unpopular figure amongst Spurs supporters. In his five years and 195 appearances at Arsenal, he won two Premier League winners medals and three FA Cup winners medals, encompassing the 2001–02 league and FA Cup double, and being part of the team that became known as The Invincibles for their undefeated 2003–04 Premier League campaign. He scored Arsenal's only goal in their 2–1 defeat to Barcelona in the 2006 UEFA Champions League final.

In August 2006, he joined Portsmouth on a free transfer. His three years with the club included captaining them to victory in the 2008 FA Cup final. After a surprising stint at League Two side Notts County, he returned to train with Arsenal and re-signed with the club on a short-term contract. He then spent a season with Newcastle United, before announcing his retirement a year later. Following a brief foray into politics in which he failed to be shortlisted for the 2016 London mayoral election, Campbell moved into coaching and was later named as the assistant manager of the Trinidad and Tobago national team. He became the new manager of Macclesfield Town, eventually saving the club from relegation to the National League. After leaving the club in the summer, he joined Southend United, who were in a similar relegation battle. However, the season was ended early due to the COVID-19 pandemic, which culminated in Southend's relegation and Campbell leaving the club by mutual consent.

Campbell gained his first of 73 full caps for England aged 21. In May 1998, Campbell became what was then England's second-youngest captain, after Bobby Moore, aged 23 years 248 days. In 2006, he became the only player to have represented England in six consecutive major tournaments, playing in the 1996, 2000 and 2004 UEFA European Championships; and the 1998, 2002 and 2006 FIFA World Cups. He was named in the Team of the Tournament for the 2002 World Cup. He was in the PFA Team of the Year three times, in 1999, 2003 and 2004.

== Early life ==
Campbell was born in Plaistow, London, to Jamaican parents Sewell and Wihelmina. He was the youngest of twelve children, nine of whom were boys. His father was a railway worker and his mother, Wihelmina, was a Ford factory worker. Despite growing up in a rough neighbourhood in a family with very little money, Campbell veered away from a life of crime due to his strict parents.

"I became a recluse within my own house. I became insular because at home there was no space to grow or to evolve, everything was tight and there was no room to breathe. People don't realise how that affects you as a kid. I wasn't allowed to speak, so my expression was football."

— His father paid little to no attention to him other than to discipline him, and so Campbell grew up to be quiet and polite, but also isolated.

Campbell attended the Portway Primary School and had secondary education at Lister Community School, both in Plaistow. He was a prodigious schoolboy talent and was part-educated at the FA's School of Excellence at Lilleshall, where he met table tennis player and later football agent Sky Andrew. Campbell had a short spell at West Ham United, beginning his career as a striker. He left the Youth programme at Upton Park after a coach joked to him that Campbell would be pleased to hear that the West Indies were beating England at cricket; Campbell took this to be offensive.

== Club career ==
=== Tottenham Hotspur ===
Following his experience at West Ham United, Campbell was reluctant to join another professional club's youth programme, but after two months of persistence from Tottenham Hotspur's chief scout Len Cheesewright, he eventually joined the Tottenham Youth team. Youth team manager Keith Waldon later recalled that it was his physicality rather than his technical ability which made him stand out as a good prospect for the future. At age 14, he was one of only 16 young footballers accepted onto a training programme at Lilleshall Hall. Waldon offered to make him captain of the youth team, but Campbell declined the offer as he wanted to concentrate on his own game.

Campbell made his first team debut for Spurs on 5 December 1992 against Chelsea at White Hart Lane, scoring the goal in a 2–1 defeat after coming on as a substitute for Nick Barmby. Despite this start to his career, he was not picked by manager Ray Clemence again throughout the remainder of the 1992–93 season.

New boss Osvaldo Ardiles played him at left back at the start of the 1993–94 season in place of the injured Justin Edinburgh, before he was switched to right back in place of Dean Austin. At the end of the season, he signed a four-year contract with the club.

New manager Gerry Francis led the club to the semi-finals of the FA Cup in the 1994–95 campaign, but Campbell missed the match due to injury and Spurs were beaten by Everton. Campbell continued to progress in his performances, but Spurs struggled to mid-table league finishes in the 1995–96 and 1996–97 seasons. Francis appointed Campbell as club captain, taking over the role from the out of favour David Howells. He had a strained relationship with short-lived manager Christian Gross during the 1997–98 season as Spurs again struggled. Gross's replacement, George Graham, also had a difficult relationship with Campbell.

Campbell successfully captained his side to a League Cup final win over Leicester City in the 1998–99 season. This made him the first black captain to lift a major trophy at Wembley Stadium. He was also named on the PFA Team of the Year, as was teammate David Ginola.

The League Cup success qualified Spurs to compete in the UEFA Cup during the 1999–2000 campaign, but they only made it into the Second Round before they were beaten by German side 1. FC Kaiserslautern. During this time, he was falsely accused of breaking a stewards arm during a scuffle in a game at Derby County, and refused Tottenham's lawyer's advice to have the case Bound over (meaning he would not be convicted but would effectively have admitted some level of wrongdoing), and was subsequently told by the club to field his own legal defence for the case. The case was later dismissed. The club's lack of progress in the league, his poor relationship with recent managers and the club's lack of support during the assault case left Campbell feeling disillusioned with Spurs.

Campbell missed three months of the 2000–01 campaign after dislocating his shoulder in a 0–0 League Cup draw with Brentford at Griffin Park. He made his final appearance for the club in the FA Cup semi-final defeat to Arsenal at Old Trafford. Manager Glenn Hoddle admitted it was a risk to play Campbell as the defender was not at full fitness, and he injured his ankle fouling Ray Parlour before he was eventually replaced by Ledley King. However, before the substitution could be made, Patrick Vieira scored a header for Arsenal while Campbell was off the pitch receiving treatment.

In the summer of 2001, Campbell's contract expired. Mindful of the Bosman ruling and what happened with Steve McManaman (Britain's first high-profile Bosman related transfer), Tottenham offered him a contract which would have made him the club's highest-ever paid player, but after months of negotiations and several public assurances he would stay at Spurs, Campbell stated his need to leave the club in order to play UEFA Champions League football, with the likes of England manager Sven-Göran Eriksson advising him of such a course. Several top continental clubs expressed interest in signing him, but he joined Arsenal – Tottenham's biggest rivals – on a free transfer. Campbell had previously stated in an interview with Spurs Monthly magazine that he would never play for Arsenal. The move was also unusual as no rumours of a move to Arsenal had been leaked or speculated upon in the media before the press conference revealing his decision, and many journalists in attendance had been led to believe they were there to witness the unveiling of goalkeeper Richard Wright, which would have been a routine sports news story.

Campbell has been labelled "Judas" by some Spurs supporters. Years later, the anger from Spurs supporters remained. In January 2009, four Tottenham fans were banned from every football ground in England and Wales for three years after being found guilty of chanting an offensive song containing indecent language (with homophobic content and content which some observers interpreted as racist) aimed at Campbell. In Campbell's words:

"[Arsenal vice-chairman] David Dein made me feel protected. He was going to help and promised to be there for me. Come to us, he said, and you will be part of our family. We will protect you."

— Campbell chose to sign for Arsenal for the same reasons he left Spurs. Not only were Arsenal more likely to compete for honours, but they also promised to firmly support Campbell.

=== Arsenal ===
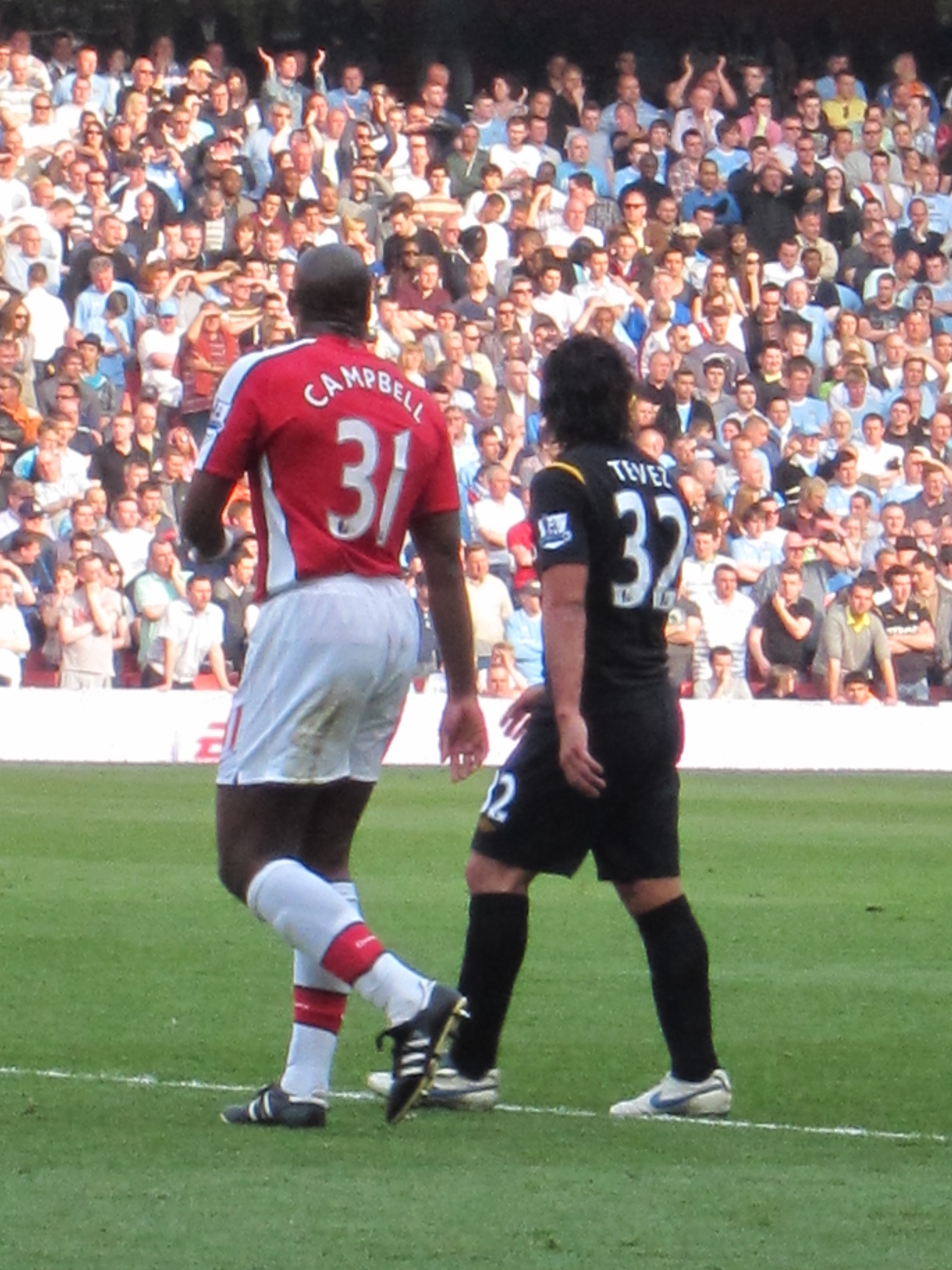
Campbell on his second spell at Arsenal in 2010 with Carlos Tevez.

Arsène Wenger later said he signed Campbell as he found that when playing against him, his attackers could not pass him like they could other players and that "it was as if he was indestructible, such a power spread from him". He made his debut for the Gunners on 18 August – the opening day of the 2001–02 Premier League season, in a 4–0 win over Middlesbrough at the Riverside Stadium. During the season, Campbell was partnered at the back by either Tony Adams (who would retire at the end of the season) or Martin Keown. He made a return to White Hart Lane during a 1–1 draw on 17 November, and though he played well, he was shocked to see his older brother Tony in the crowd supporting Spurs as the fans shouted insults out to Campbell on the pitch. Campbell enjoyed immediate success with Arsenal, as he won both Premier League and FA Cup winners' medals as Arsenal won the Double in his first season at Highbury. In the FA Cup final at the Millennium Stadium on 4 May, he played alongside Adams as the team kept a clean sheet in a 2–0 victory over Chelsea. Four days later, they secured the league title with a 1–0 victory over Manchester United at Old Trafford.

The 2002–03 season saw Arsenal exit the Champions League at the group stage, but remained on course for a retention of the Double as they reached the final of the FA Cup. However, he missed the end-of-season run-in due to suspension after referee Mark Halsey gave him a straight red card for an alleged elbow on Manchester United's Ole Gunnar Solskjær. The club appealed the suspension but were unsuccessful, and he was forced to miss the cup final as Arsenal defeated Southampton to retain the trophy, though they ended the league campaign in second place. His performances were recognised with a place on the PFA Team of the Year, alongside teammates Lauren, Ashley Cole, Patrick Vieira, Robert Pires and Thierry Henry.

"Sol had become one of our main players, and we now had an absolute physical presence and stability at the back. He is monstrous and, with his full power and also his ability to score a goal, you have an outstanding player. With Jens Lehmann, Ashley Cole, Lauren, Touré, they were all winners."

— Wenger speaking on Campbell and the defence of the Invincibles season.

The following season, 2003–04, would be known as "The Invincibles season" as Campbell formed a new partnership with Kolo Touré, with the pair instrumental in helping Arsenal regain the Premier League title without losing a single match. The title was secured with a 2–2 draw with Spurs at White Hart Lane on 25 April. He was named on the PFA Team of the Year for the third time in his career, alongside teammates Lauren, Cole, Vieira, Pires and Henry.

Campbell missed the start of the 2004–05 season with a knee injury, which meant he missed the 2004 FA Community Shield victory over Manchester United. The unbeaten run continued to a record 49 matches before Manchester United defeated them 2–0 at Old Trafford on 24 October in a match that would become known as the "Battle of the Buffet". Referee Mike Riley gave a penalty after Campbell challenged Wayne Rooney, though Campbell would maintain that the young striker had taken a dive. Towards the end of the campaign, Wenger began playing Kolo Touré and one of Pascal Cygan and Philippe Senderos in central defence, and Campbell was benched, leaving him to complain to the manager that Senderos was a "lucky player" who should not be considered good enough to play at Campbell's expense. Arsenal again finished second in the league and won the FA Cup final at Manchester United's expense, though Campbell was an unused substitute in the match.

In the 2005–06 season, Campbell was blighted both with injuries and a loss of form. In Arsenal's 3–2 home loss to West Ham United on 1 February, Campbell was largely responsible for West Ham's first two goals before being substituted at half-time at his own request. Unusually, he then left the stadium, not staying to watch the second half. His teammate Robert Pires commented that Campbell was facing a "big worry" in relation to his private life, and Campbell did not make any contact with the club for several days. He left the country and spent a week with a friend in Brussels as he reflected on his life. He resumed training with his teammates on 6 February.

Campbell was back playing on 25 April in the second leg of the UEFA Champions League semi-final against Villarreal in Spain, where a 0–0 draw on the night put the Gunners into the final. In the final against Barcelona at the Stade de France, Paris, Campbell scored the opening goal, a header from a free-kick taken from Henry after a foul on Emmanuel Eboué. However, ten-man Arsenal went on to lose 2–1, although Campbell was at least involved in the best defensive run of any team in the history of the competition, with opponents failing to score against Arsenal in ten consecutive matches and a total of 995 minutes. Campbell also holds the distinction, alongside Teddy Sheringham, Steve McManaman, Steven Gerrard, Frank Lampard and Wayne Rooney, as one of six Englishmen to have scored in a Champions League final. In July 2006, Campbell left Arsenal by mutual consent in order to seek "a fresh challenge".

=== Portsmouth ===
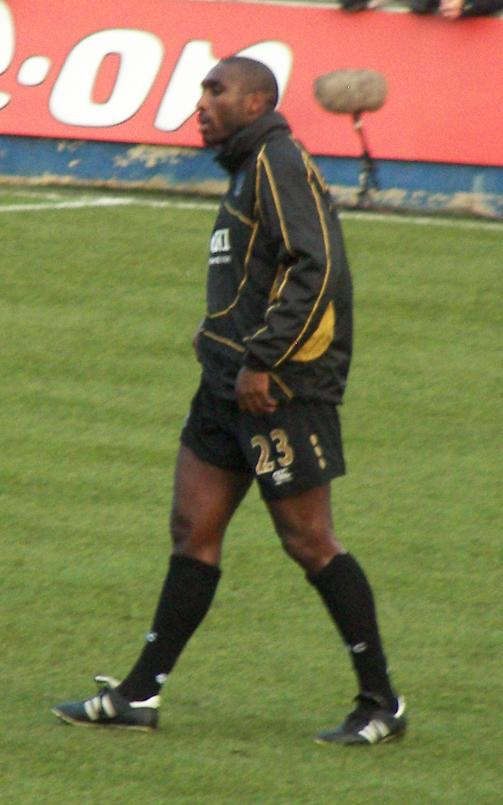
Campbell before a Portsmouth match in 2008.

Campbell was courted by Italian club Juventus, but manager Didier Deschamps eventually ended contract negotiations. Campbell then rejected an approach from Turkish side Fenerbahçe. Instead, he remained in England and joined Premier League club Portsmouth, signing a two-year contract in August 2006. His time at Pompey started well, as he formed a successful partnership in the centre of defence with Linvoy Primus and helped the club to keep five consecutive clean sheets. He scored his first goal for the club in a 3–1 win over Sheffield United on 23 December.

He was named as captain for the 2007–08 season by manager Harry Redknapp, and signed a new two-year contract with the club. He captained the club to a 1–0 win over Cardiff City at Wembley Stadium in the 2008 FA Cup final.

The club went into severe financial difficulties, and Redknapp resigned, but Campbell stayed and helped the club to avoid relegation in the 2008–09 campaign. In January 2010, Campbell sued Portsmouth for £1.7 million in unpaid image rights and bonus payments.

"I enjoyed my spell at Portsmouth; it was like going back to a different time. Everyone was up against it, mucking in."

— Campbell enjoyed his time at the club.

=== Notts County ===
Campbell signed a five-year deal with League Two side Notts County in August 2009. Campbell said that County, who had recently been the subject of a takeover by a Middle Eastern consortium, were the best club for "where I am at the moment in my life", and that the recent appointment of ex-England manager Sven-Göran Eriksson as director of football played a "big role" in his decision. He made his debut for County in a 2–1 defeat to Morecambe at Christie Park on 19 September. He walked out on the club three days later, and his contract was cancelled by mutual consent on 24 September. He later admitted he felt embarrassed and that "I was being a mug" in believing the club's owners were ambitious billionaires who intended to take the club into the Premier League.

=== Return to Arsenal ===
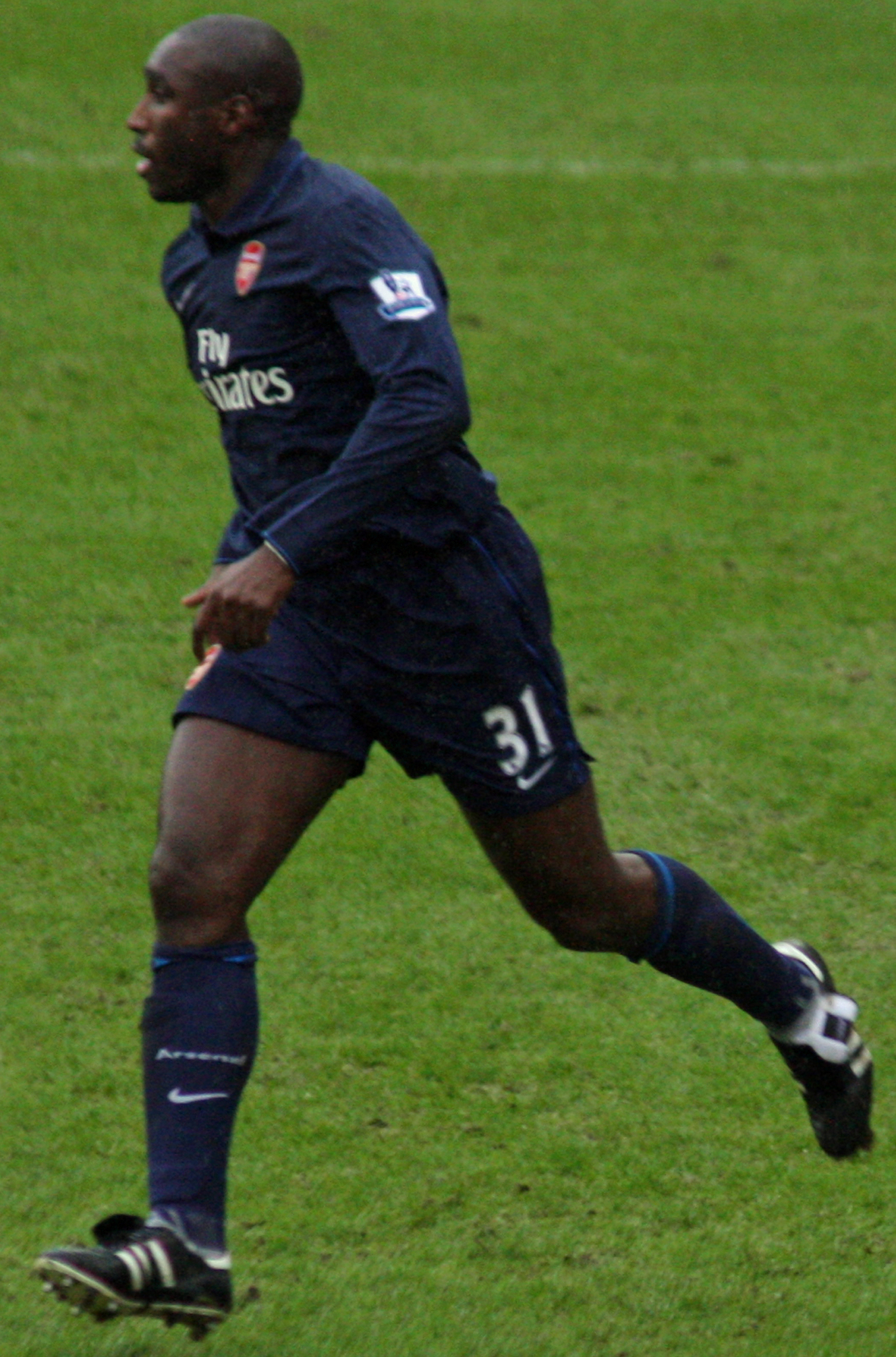
Campbell playing for Arsenal against Stoke City in 2010.

Campbell began training with the Arsenal side in mid-October 2009 in a bid to maintain his fitness ahead of the January transfer window. On 15 January, he re-signed with the club. It was announced he would wear the number 31 shirt. Nine days later, he made his second debut for the Gunners in an FA Cup defeat to Stoke City. On 18 February, he scored his first goal in his second stint at the club with a headed goal against Porto in the first leg of the UEFA Champions League round of 16. Due to injuries to Thomas Vermaelen and William Gallas towards the end of the season, he found himself starting frequently for Arsenal.

=== Newcastle United ===
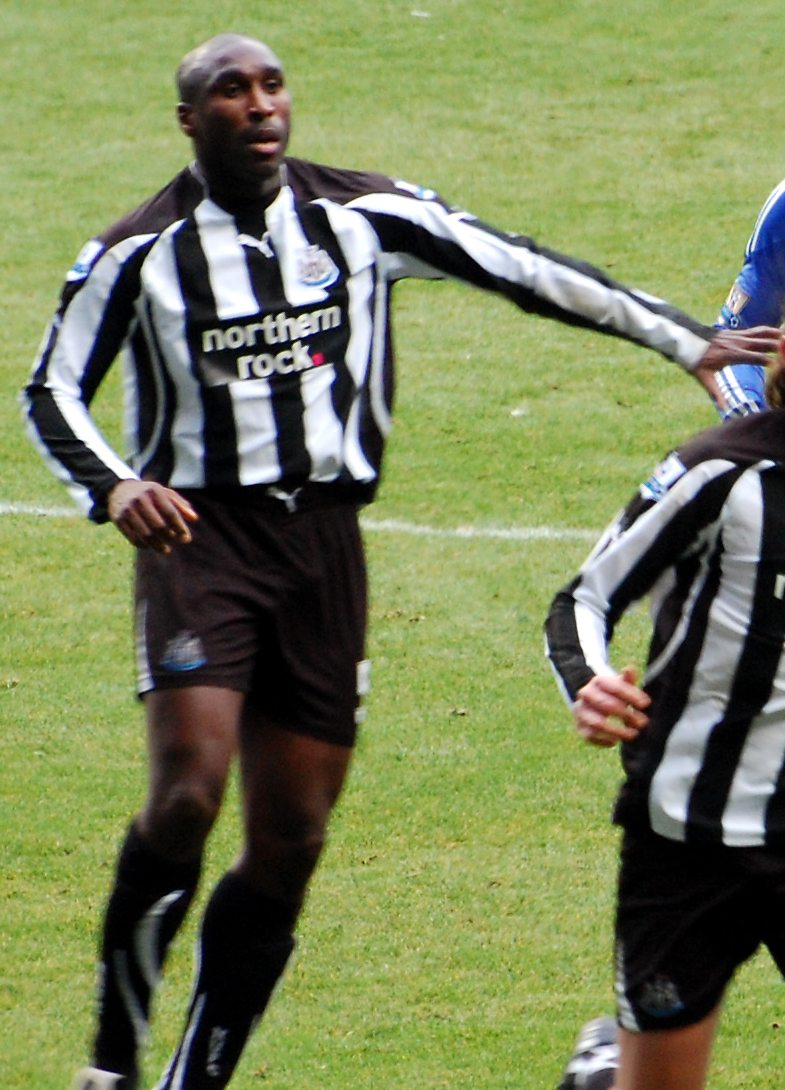
Sol Campbell playing for Newcastle against Chelsea in 2010.

In July 2010, after turning down an offer of a two-year contract with Scottish club Celtic, Campbell joined Newcastle United on a one-year contract. He made his first appearance for the Magpies in a League Cup win over Chelsea on 22 September. On 3 October, he made his Premier League debut for the club as a 38th-minute substitute for Fabricio Coloccini in a 2–1 defeat to Manchester City at the City of Manchester Stadium. In doing so, he became only the second player after Ryan Giggs to play in the first 19 seasons of the Premier League. On 28 November, Campbell made his first Premier League start for Newcastle against Chelsea, and was given the captain's armband after Shola Ameobi was substituted. Campbell started again in Newcastle's next two fixtures with West Bromwich Albion and Liverpool, but lost his place upon the return of Coloccini. After a long period out with viruses, Campbell returned to bench duty in January, making his first appearance in two months as a substitute in Newcastle's 2–0 win over Birmingham City on 15 February.

In May 2011, manager Alan Pardew announced Campbell was a free agent after the club opted not to renew his contract. Campbell announced his retirement from football a year later in May 2012.

== International career ==
Campbell was a regular through the various England youth teams, and picked up two man of the match awards during the 1993 UEFA European Under-19 Championship which England won with a 1–0 win over Turkey.

Campbell made his international debut as a substitute against Hungary on 18 May 1996. Although he had only one cap by the time Terry Venables selected his squad for UEFA Euro 1996, 21-year-old Campbell made the squad as defensive cover. He won his second cap in England's 2–0 group stage match against Scotland, again as a substitute.

"When I put on the England shirt, I had a collection of thoughts. It was like going into battle, fighting for your team and your country. I would think that I'm playing against the best players in the world and would love that I could master them, control them and nullify them."

— His international career was an immense source of pride for Campbell.

Over the next two years, under new manager Glenn Hoddle, Campbell became a regular member of England's defence, partnering Gareth Southgate and Tony Adams. On 29 May 1998, aged 23 years and 248 days, Campbell became England's second-youngest captain after Bobby Moore in a 0–0 draw against Belgium, though Michael Owen subsequently overtook Campbell after captaining England against Paraguay in April 2002. Campbell started all four of England's matches in the 1998 World Cup.

During the 1998 World Cup, Campbell was involved in a highly controversial incident in England's second round clash against Argentina. With less than ten minutes to play, the score was 2–2 and England were down to ten men after David Beckham was sent off. Campbell headed a corner into the Argentine net and wheeled away to celebrate his first international goal, which appeared to be the winning goal which would have put England into the quarter finals. However, the referee disallowed the goal after ruling that Alan Shearer had illegally contacted the goalkeeper, and England eventually lost the match on penalties.

Campbell was England's first-choice centre back throughout the successful qualification campaign for Euro 2000 under new boss Kevin Keegan, and played in all three group games at the tournament, which England exited after defeat by Romania.

After the retirement of Tony Adams, Campbell partnered Rio Ferdinand in England's successful qualification campaign for the 2002 World Cup, held in Korea and Japan. He scored his only senior international goal at the tournament, a header off a corner kick by Beckham in the opening group game against Sweden. The match ended 1–1, but in their next match, England defeated Argentina 1–0. Campbell's partnership with Ferdinand was an integral part of a strong defensive performance throughout the tournament, and he was the only England player to be named in the FIFA World Cup All-Star Team. England progressed to the quarter-finals, where they lost to eventual winners Brazil despite playing the last 30 minutes against ten men.

Campbell maintained his place in the centre of defence as he took part in England's successful qualification campaign for Euro 2004. England went on to reach the quarter-finals clash with hosts Portugal, and with the score tied at 1–1, Campbell won a header in the opposition six-yard box to score what seemed to be a late winner for England. However, referee Urs Meier decided that John Terry had pushed Portuguese goalkeeper Ricardo and instead gave a free-kick. The game ended 2–2 after extra time, and England lost the penalty shoot-out.

Campbell continued to play for England after Euro 2004, although his place in the international team had become less secure since the emergence of the central defensive partnership of Terry and Ferdinand, which blossomed during Campbell's period of absence with injury in 2005. He was named in England's squad for the 2006 World Cup, but was third-choice centre back, with coach Sven-Göran Eriksson preferring the partnership of Ferdinand and Terry. However, after a knock to Ferdinand, Campbell came on as a substitute in England's group match against Sweden, which made him the first player to represent England on the pitch at six consecutive international tournaments. After Eriksson's resignation, new coach Steve McClaren chose to look elsewhere for central defensive strength and Campbell was dropped for his first match in charge against Greece in August 2006.

After injuries to Ledley King, Jonathan Woodgate and Michael Dawson, along with Jamie Carragher retiring from international football, Campbell was recalled to the national team. He played four matches under McClaren as England's qualification campaign failed.

New head coach Fabio Capello did not select Campbell for his first squad in January 2008. Campbell enjoyed a fine run of form on his return to Arsenal and had retained hope of making it to England's squad for the 2010 World Cup, which would have been his fourth outing on the world stage along with a record seventh major tournament for his country. However, he was not named in Capello's 30-man preliminary squad, with the coach opting instead for Carragher and King among others as potential defensive cover for Ferdinand and Terry.

== Style of play ==
Regarded as one of the best English centre backs of his generation, Campbell was a strong, athletic and imposing defender, with a good positional sense, and was also a strong tackler. Due to his height and physical power, he excelled in the air, both offensively and defensively, although he initially had to work hard to improve his heading ability during his teenage years. He did not possess good natural stamina, but had pace, power, agility and quick feet, as well as significant mental strength. Due to his versatility and range of skills, as well as his ability to carry the ball out of defence and get forward, he was also capable of playing as a right back on occasion. However, despite being fairly comfortable in possession, he frequently drew criticism throughout his career for his poor distribution.

== Managerial career ==
On 30 January 2017, Campbell was named as Dennis Lawrence's assistant manager, after the latter was appointed manager of the Trinidad and Tobago national team.

=== Macclesfield Town ===
Campbell was appointed manager of Macclesfield Town on 27 November 2018, then bottom of League Two and five points adrift of safety. Under Campbell, Macclesfield finished 22nd in League Two, three points above the bottom two relegation places. They stayed up on the last day of the season with a 1–1 draw with Cambridge United. He oversaw eight wins and 12 draws in his 30 games in charge. It was announced on 15 August 2019 that Campbell would be leaving the financially troubled club, by mutual agreement. In December 2019, Campbell backed a HM Revenue and Customs bid to wind-up the club, claiming to be owed £180,000.

=== Southend United ===
On 22 October 2019, Campbell was appointed manager of EFL League One club Southend United. Campbell watched his new side lose 7–1 to Doncaster Rovers before taking charge for his first game — a 3–1 home defeat to Ipswich Town. On 18 January 2020, Southend won their second game under Campbell with a 2–1 victory away at Accrington Stanley, the club's first league win since September 2019. However, financial constraints prevented Campbell from signing any new players during the January 2020 transfer window. In June 2020, the season was ended early due to the COVID-19 pandemic in England. At the time Southend were second from bottom in League One, 16 points from safety. Following a decision not to restart the season, Southend were relegated to League Two. Campbell left the club on 30 June 2020.

== Political views ==
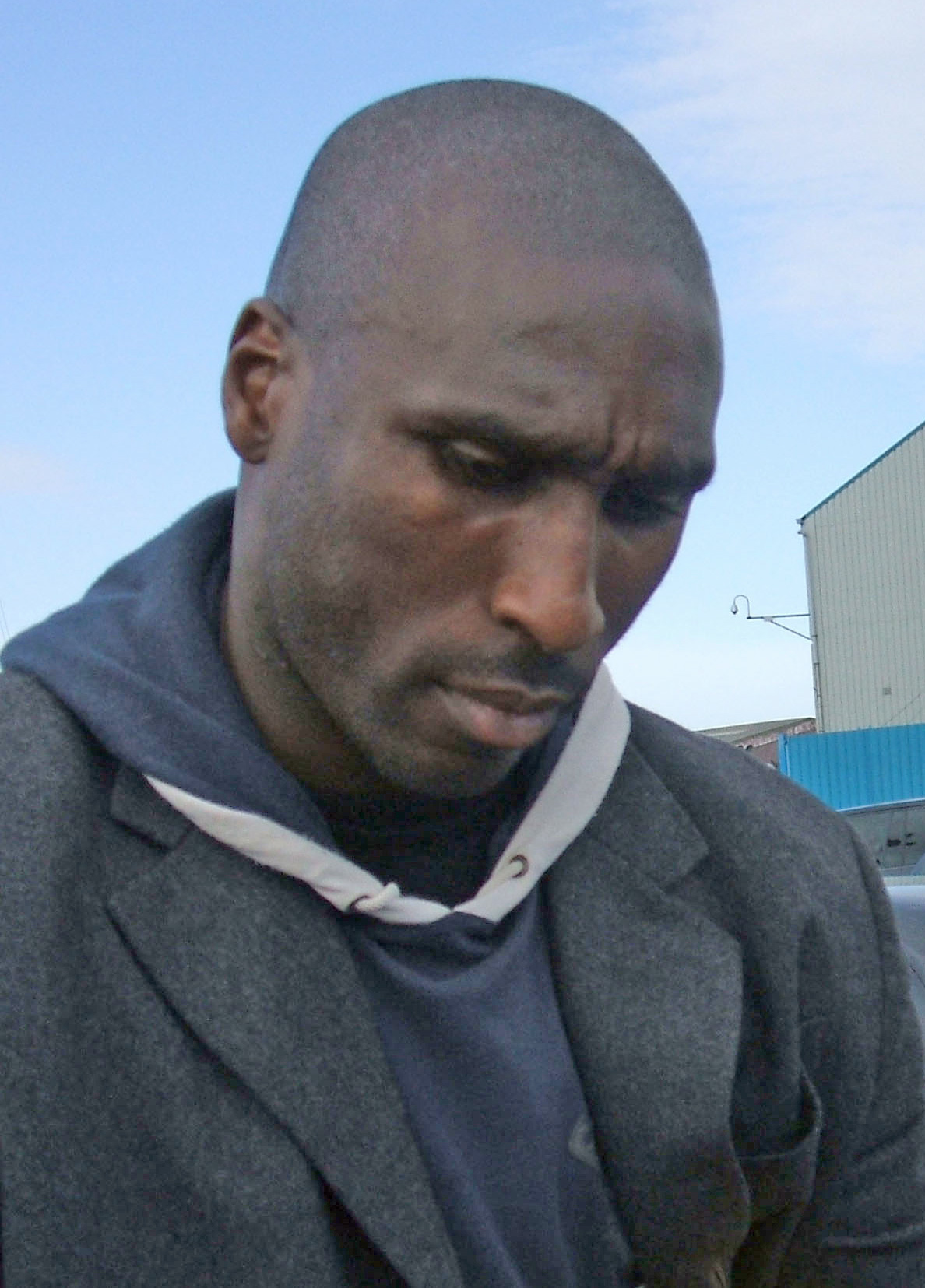
Campbell in 2007

After his retirement from football, Campbell became increasingly vocal about British politics. In 2013, he said he liked "the mentality of Labour but the policies of the Conservatives". In 2014, he criticised Ed Miliband's proposals for a mansion tax on properties worth over £2 million, calling it "madness".

Campbell said in 2014 that he was considering joining the Conservative Party and would be interested in helping the party gain more of "the black vote". In February 2015, he confirmed his intention to run for the party's nomination for Mayor of London in the 2016 election. In the list of four candidates chosen in July 2015, Campbell was not shortlisted.

Prior to the 2015 United Kingdom general election, Campbell featured in a poster for Operation Black Vote in which his skin was artificially whitened, with the words "If you don't register to vote, you're taking the colour out of Britain". During the 2016 referendum on whether the United Kingdom should remain a member of, or leave, the European Union, Campbell supported Brexit.

Campbell has criticised the lack of racial diversity in The Football Association ("FA"), and he made newspaper headlines in March 2014 after claiming that institutional racism on the part of the FA meant he was never chosen to captain the England team during his playing career. Campbell had been named as starting captain for England in a friendly against the United States in May 2005 under Sven-Göran Eriksson.

== Personal life ==
In 2006, Campbell was reportedly in a ten-month relationship with society designer Kelly Hoppen, that they had ended. In 2008, Campbell began dating interior designer Fiona Barratt, the granddaughter of Barratt Homes founder Sir Lawrie Barratt. They married in Corbridge, Northumberland, on 17 July 2010. He has a son from a previous relationship with Janet Tyler.

Campbell had homes in London and at Hallington Hall at Hallington in Northumberland. In December 2015, Hallington Hall was put up for sale for just under £6 million after being totally renovated.

=== Charitable work ===
In 2009, Campbell launched his charity "Kids go live" which allows inner city children to see a variety of live sporting events such as Wimbledon, the Olympic Games and rugby internationals.

== Career statistics ==
=== Club ===
Appearances and goals by club, season and competition
Season	Club	Division	League		FA Cup		League Cup		Europe		Other		Total	
Season	Club	Division	Apps	Goals	Apps	Goals	Apps	Goals	Apps	Goals	Apps	Goals	Apps	Goals
Tottenham Hotspur	1992–93	Premier League	1	1	0	0	0	0	—		—		1	1
Tottenham Hotspur	1993–94	Premier League	34	0	3	0	5	1	—		—		42	1
Tottenham Hotspur	1994–95	Premier League	30	0	3	0	3	0	—		—		36	0
Tottenham Hotspur	1995–96	Premier League	31	1	6	0	2	0	0	0	—		39	1
Tottenham Hotspur	1996–97	Premier League	38	0	1	0	4	1	—		—		43	1
Tottenham Hotspur	1997–98	Premier League	34	0	3	1	3	0	—		—		40	1
Tottenham Hotspur	1998–99	Premier League	37	6	7	0	8	2	—		—		52	8
Tottenham Hotspur	1999–2000	Premier League	29	0	2	0	2	0	2 (Note: Appearances in UEFA Cup)	0	—		35	0
Tottenham Hotspur	2000–01	Premier League	21	2	5	0	1	0	—		—		27	2
Tottenham Hotspur	Total		255	10	30	1	28	4	2	0	—		315	15
Arsenal	2001–02	Premier League	31	2	7	1	0	0	10 (Note: Appearances in UEFA Champions League)	0	—		48	3
Arsenal	2002–03	Premier League	33	2	5	1	0	0	10	0	1 (Note: Appearance in FA Community Shield)	0	49	3
Arsenal	2003–04	Premier League	35	1	5	0	0	0	9	0	1	0	50	1
Arsenal	2004–05	Premier League	16	1	1	0	0	0	4	0	0	0	21	1
Arsenal	2005–06	Premier League	20	2	1	0	2	0	6	1	0	0	29	3
Arsenal	Total		135	8	19	2	2	0	39	1	2	0	197	11
Portsmouth	2006–07	Premier League	32	1	2	0	0	0	—		—		34	1
Portsmouth	2007–08	Premier League	31	1	5	0	1	0	—		—		37	1
Portsmouth	2008–09	Premier League	32	0	3	0	0	0	4	0	1	0	40	0
Portsmouth	Total		95	2	10	0	1	0	4	0	1	0	111	2
Notts County	2009–10	League Two	1	0	—		—		—		—		1	0
Arsenal	2009–10	Premier League	11	0	1	0	—		2	1	—		14	1
Newcastle United	2010–11	Premier League	7	0	0	0	1	0	—		—		8	0
Career total			504	20	60	3	32	4	47	2	3	0	646	29

=== International ===
Appearances and goals by national team and year
National team	Year	Apps	Goals
England	1996	3	0
England	1997	9	0
England	1998	12	0
England	1999	5	0
England	2000	8	0
England	2001	5	0
England	2002	10	1
England	2003	4	0
England	2004	8	0
England	2005	2	0
England	2006	3	0
England	2007	4	0
Total		73	1

Scores and results list England's goal tally first, score column indicates score after Campbell goal.

International goal scored by Sol Campbell
No.	Date	Venue	Opponent	Score	Result	Competition
1	2 June 2002	Saitama Stadium, Saitama, Japan	Sweden	1–0	1–1	2002 FIFA World Cup

== Managerial statistics ==
As of match played 7 March 2020

Managerial record by team and tenure
Team	From	To	Record					Ref.
Team	From	To	P	W	D	L	Win %	Ref.
Macclesfield Town	27 November 2018	15 August 2019	30	8	12	10	26.7	
Southend United	23 October 2019	30 June 2020	23	4	5	14	17.4	
Total			53	12	17	24	22.6	

== Honours ==
=== Player ===
Tottenham Hotspur

- Football League Cup: 1998–99

Arsenal

- Premier League: 2001–02, 2003–04
- FA Cup: 2001–02, 2002–03,2004–05
- FA Community Shield: 2002
- UEFA Champions League runner-up: 2005–06

Portsmouth

- FA Cup: 2007–08

England U19

- UEFA European Under-19 Championship: 1993

England U21

- Toulon Tournament: 1994

Individual

- PFA Premier League Team of the Year: 1998–99, 2002–03, 2003–04
- FIFA World Cup All-Star Team: 2002
- Ballon d'Or nominee: 2003
- FIFA World Cup Fans' All-Star Team: 2002
- UEFA European Championship Team of the Tournament: 2004
