= Ronny Rosenthal =

Israeli footballer (born 1963)

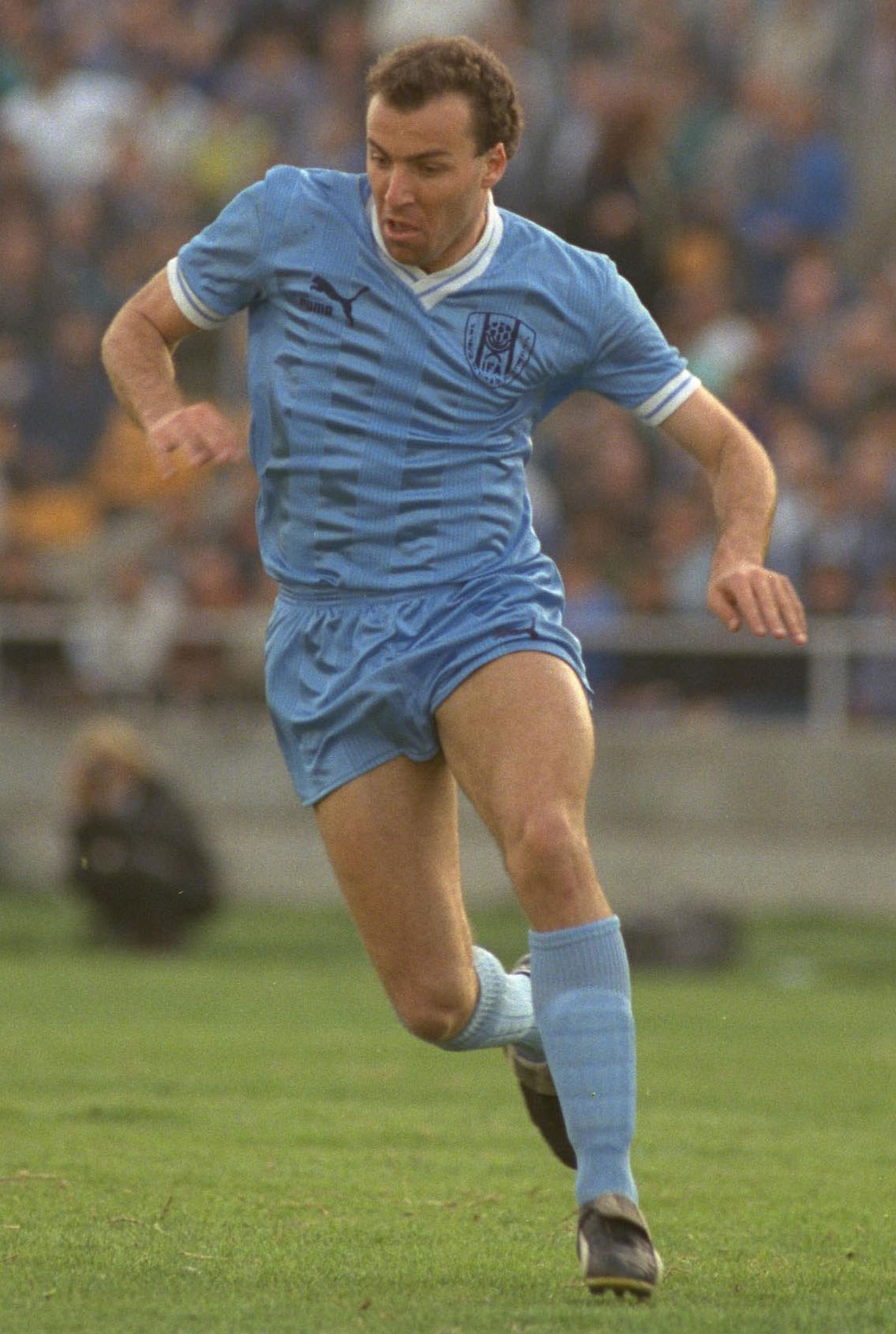
- Rosenthal with Israel in 1989

Personal information
- Full name: רוני רוזנטל
- Date of birth: 11 October 1963 (age 63)
- Place of birth: Haifa, Israel
- Height: 5 ft 11 in (1.80 m)
- Positions: Forward; striker

Youth career
- 1974–1979: Maccabi Haifa

Senior career*
Years	Team	Apps	(Gls)
1979–1986	Maccabi Haifa	137	(42)
1986–1988	Club Brugge	43	(15)
1988–1990	Standard Liège	44	(20)
1990	→ Liverpool (loan)	8	(7)
1990–1994	Liverpool	66	(14)
1994–1997	Tottenham Hotspur	88	(4)
1997–1999	Watford	30	(8)
Total		416	(110)

International career
1983–1997	Israel (Note: Does not include 5 caps and 1 goal from non-FIFA recognised games)	55	(10)
- * Club domestic league appearances and goals as of 01:26, 20 November 2007 (UTC)

Ronny Rosenthal (Hebrew: רוני רוזנטל; born 11 October 1963), nicknamed "Rocket Ronny", is an Israeli former footballer who played as a forward.

After starting his career in his birth city with Maccabi Haifa, Rosenthal went on to play in Belgium with Club Brugge and Standard Liège. He moved to Liverpool in 1990 for a fee of £1.1 million, becoming the first non-UK player to move to an English club for more than £1 million. After four years at Liverpool, Rosenthal finished his career with Tottenham Hotspur and Watford.

Between 1983 and 1997 he made 60 appearances for the Israel national team, scoring 11 goals.

== Early and personal life ==
Rosenthal was born in Haifa, Israel. His father, who was born in Bucharest, Romania and is of Ashkenazi Jewish descent, immigrated to Israel later on. His mother, born in Morocco to a Moroccan Jewish family, also immigrated to Israel. His brother Lior Rosenthal is also a former footballer who played for Maccabi Haifa and the Israeli national team.

Rosenthal married a Belgian, Nancy, who converted to Judaism. Their two sons, Dean Rosenthal—who was Bar Mitzvah in Israel—and Tom Rosenthal, were born in England. Dean is director of a sporting management company; while Tom, formerly on the books of Queens Park Rangers as a midfielder, formerly played for the Dutch team FC Dordrecht, and has been capped by Belgium at the under-18 and U19 levels—where he scored three goals—and has switched to Israel and was named to its U21 national team in 2018 for the Euro 2019 qualifiers against Germany and Norway.

Rosenthal now resides in London, and has worked as a football agent and consultant. His nephew is Israeli international footballer Denny Gropper.

On 11 May 2019, Rosenthal and his family were subjected to a "terrifying ordeal", when masked machetes-holding robbers, raided his home in Cricklewood, England.

== Club career ==
He was left-footed, and began his playing career with Maccabi Haifa in the city in which he was born in his native Israel, winning two Israeli league titles. Rosenthal left his homeland to sign for Belgian side Club Brugge KV in 1988. He scored 15 goals in two seasons, and won the Belgian league title one season.

After a deal to join Udinese fell through due to a failed medical, and a trial at Luton Town which saw him score twice in three games, Rosenthal joined English side Liverpool on loan in March 1990, as manager Kenny Dalglish looked to increase his options for the forward positions during Liverpool's league title run-in. He made his debut for the Reds in a 3-2 win over Southampton at Anfield on 31 March 1990, scoring his first goal for the club eleven days later in a 4-0 away win over Charlton Athletic at Selhurst Park. He scored seven goals in eight Football League First Division games, including a hat-trick against Charlton Athletic, which helped Liverpool secure their third league title in five seasons. His move to Anfield was then made permanent for a fee of £1 million - double the fee which had been quoted before the loan deal was agreed. At Anfield, he became a cult hero.

During the 1990–91 season, Rosenthal faced continued fierce competition for a place in the first team from Liverpool's established strikers Ian Rush and Peter Beardsley, and then from mid-season signing David Speedie. He played 16 times in the league, and scored five goals as Liverpool finished second in the league. In 1991–92, Rosenthal played 20 times in the league, but it was a frustrating league campaign for both player and club, as the Reds finished sixth in the league and Rosenthal only found the net three times. Liverpool did win the FA Cup that season, but Rosenthal was not selected for the final. Despite the pre-season departure of both Speedie and Beardsley, Rosenthal was now faced with competition for a place from new signing Dean Saunders. 1992–93 was slightly better, as Rosenthal played 27 games in the new Premier League, and scored six goals, but it was another frustrating season for Liverpool, who finished sixth in the league once again and spent most of the season occupying even lower positions. Saunders had been sold to Aston Villa early in the season, while new signing Paul Stewart proved to be a major disappointment. A memorable occasion during that first Premier League season came when Rosenthal hit the crossbar with a shot on an open goal in a league match against Aston Villa.

With the arrival of Nigel Clough in the summer of 1993, and the breakthrough of Robbie Fowler soon after, Rosenthal played just three league games for Liverpool in 1993–94 and was sold to Tottenham Hotspur in January 1994. Rosenthal scored on his debut in February 1994, in a home defeat to Sheffield Wednesday. He became a regular member of the first team at White Hart Lane, playing 15 league games and scoring twice before the season's end. Despite Teddy Sheringham overcoming injury problems, and the close season signing of Jürgen Klinsmann, Rosenthal still managed to appear in 20 Premier League games in 1994–95, though he failed to score. His best form came in the FA Cup, in which he scored five goals in Tottenham's run to the semi-final. This included a hat-trick in a 6–2 fifth round replay win at Southampton. Klinsmann was then sold to Bayern Munich and Spurs signed Chris Armstrong, but Rosenthal still played in all but five of Tottenham's 38 Premier League games in 1995–96, mostly as a substitute, but only scored one goal.

1996–97 brought a similar story for player and club. For the third consecutive season, Spurs fell short of a UEFA Cup place, while Rosenthal was on the scoresheet only once in the league, and this time was restricted to 20 league appearances. In more than three years in North London, Rosenthal had appeared in 88 league games (55 of them starts) but scored just four goals. He then dropped down two divisions to sign for Watford, and played 30 games over the next seasons and scored eight goals as Watford won back-to-back promotions to reach the FA Premier League. He then retired from playing at the age of 35.

== International career ==
Rosenthal was also a regular member of the Israel national team for most of his career. He won his first senior cap in 1983, and by the time his international career drew to a close in 1997, he had been capped 60 times and scored 11 goals.

== Career statistics ==
=== Club ===
Appearances and goals by club, season and competition
Club	Season	League			National cup (Note: Includes FA Cup)		League cup (Note: Includes Football League Cup)		Continental		Other		Total	
Club	Season	Division	Apps	Goals	Apps	Goals	Apps	Goals	Apps	Goals	Apps	Goals	Apps	Goals
Maccabi Haifa	1980–81	Liga Artzit	27	4			—		—		—		27	4
Maccabi Haifa	1981–82	Liga Leumit	24	7			—		—		—		24	7
Maccabi Haifa	1983–84	Liga Leumit	23	6			—		—		—		23	6
Maccabi Haifa	1984–85	Liga Leumit	30	12			—		—		—		30	12
Maccabi Haifa	1985–86	Liga Leumit	33	13			—		—		—		33	13
Maccabi Haifa	Total		137	42			—		—		—		137	42
Club Brugge	1986–87	Belgian First Division	28	11			—		2 (Note: Appearances in UEFA Cup Winners' Cup)	2	—		30	13
Club Brugge	1987–88	Belgian First Division	15	4			—		8 (Note: Appearances in UEFA Cup)	0	—		23	4
Club Brugge	Total		43	15			—		10	2	—		53	17
Standard Liège	1988–89	Belgian First Division	30	14			—		—		—		30	14
Standard Liège	1989–90	Belgian First Division	14	6			—		—		—		14	6
Standard Liège	Total		44	20			—		—		—		44	20
Liverpool (loan)	1989–90	First Division	8	7	0	0	0	0	—		—		8	7
Liverpool	1990–91	First Division	16	5	3	0	3	0	—		1 (Note: Appearance in FA Charity Shield)	0	23	5
Liverpool	1991–92	First Division	20	3	3	0	0	0	1	0	—		27	3
Liverpool	1992–93	Premier League	27	6	2	0	3	1	3	0	1	0	36	7
Liverpool	1993–94	Premier League	3	0	0	0	0	0	—		—		3	0
Liverpool	Total		74	21	8	0	9	1	4	0	2	0	97	22
Tottenham Hotspur	1993–94	Premier League	15	2					—		—		15	2
Tottenham Hotspur	1994–95	Premier League	20	0	4	4	1	0	—		—		25	4
Tottenham Hotspur	1995–96	Premier League	33	1	5	2	2	1	—		—		40	4
Tottenham Hotspur	1996–97	Premier League	20	1					—		—		20	1
Tottenham Hotspur	Total		88	4	9	6	3	1	—		—		100	11
Watford	1997–98	Second Division	25	8			4	1	—		—		29	9
Watford	1998–99	First Division	5	0	1	0	2	0	—		—		8	0
Watford	Total		30	8	1	0	6	1	—		—		37	9
Career total			416	110	18	6	18	3	14	2	2	0	468	121

=== International ===
Appearances and goals by national team and year
National team	Year	Apps	Goals
Israel	1984	1	0
Israel	1985	7	0
Israel	1986	3	0
Israel	1987	2	0
Israel	1988	4	1
Israel	1989	8	2
Israel	1992	4	1
Israel	1993	7	2
Israel	1994	7	3
Israel	1995	5	1
Israel	1996	3	0
Israel	1997	4	0
Total		55	10

Israel score listed first, score column indicates score after each Rosenthal goal

List of international goals scored by Ronny Rosenthal
No.	Date	Venue	Cap	Opponent	Score	Result	Competition
1	10 February 1988	Ramat Gan Stadium, Ramat Gan, Israel	17	Poland	1–0	1–3	Friendly
2	4 March 1989	Ramat Gan Stadium, Ramat Gan, Israel	22	New Zealand	1–0	1–0	1990 FIFA World Cup qualification
3	9 April 1989	Mount Smart Stadium, Auckland, New Zealand	24	New Zealand	1–0	2–2	1990 FIFA World Cup qualification
4	9 September 1992	Stadion Stali Mielec, Mielec, Poland	26	Poland	1–1	1–1	Friendly
5	11 May 1993	Vasil Levski National Stadium, Sofia, Bulgaria	32	Bulgaria	2–1	2–2	1994 FIFA World Cup qualification
6	27 October 1993	Ramat Gan Stadium, Ramat Gan, Israel	35	Austria	1–0	1–1	1994 FIFA World Cup qualification
7	16 November 1994	Hüseyin Avni Aker Stadium, Trabzon, Turkey	41	Azerbaijan	2–0	2–0	UEFA Euro 1996 qualifying
8	29 November 1994	Teddy Stadium, Jerusalem, Israel	42	Cyprus	4–3	4–3	Friendly
9	14 December 1994	Ramat Gan Stadium, Ramat Gan, Israel	43	Romania	1–1	1–1	UEFA Euro 1996 qualifying
10	25 April 1995	Górnik Zabrze Stadium, Zabrze, Poland	45	Poland	1–1	3–4	UEFA Euro 1996 qualifying

== Honours ==
Maccabi Haifa

- Liga Leumit: 1983–84, 1984–85; runner-up, 1985–86

Club Brugge KV

- Belgian First Division: 1987–88

Liverpool

- Football League First Division: 1989–90
- FA Charity Shield: 1990

Watford

- Football League Second Division: 1997–98

== See also ==
- List of Jewish footballers
