= Paul Mahorn =

English footballer

Personal information
- Full name: Paul Gladstone Mahorn
- Date of birth: 13 August 1973 (age 53)
- Place of birth: Leytonstone, England
- Height: 5 ft 10 in (1.78 m)
- Position: Forward

Youth career
- Tottenham Hotspur

Senior career*
Years	Team	Apps	(Gls)
1992–1998	Tottenham Hotspur	3	(0)
1993	→ Fulham (loan)	3	(0)
1996	→ Burnley (loan)	8	(1)
1997	→ Brentford (loan)	0	(0)
1998	Port Vale	1	(0)
1998	Stevenage Borough		
	Bishop's Stortford	6	(0)
- Cambridge City
- Cambridge United
Total		15+	(1+)
- * Club domestic league appearances and goals

Paul Gladstone Mahorn (born 13 August 1973) is an English former football forward. He spent 1992 to 1998 with Tottenham Hotspur, but only played three Premier League games, and was also loaned out to Fulham and Burnley. In 1998, he played one game for Port Vale, before moving into non-League circles with Stevenage Borough, Cambridge City, and Cambridge United.

== Career ==
Mahorn started his career with Tottenham Hotspur and made his Premier League debut on 22 January 1993, in a 2–1 defeat to Swindon Town at the County Ground. He played three Second Division games on loan with Don Mackay's Fulham in the 1993–94 season. He played eight Second Division games whilst on loan with Adrian Heath's Burnley in the 1995–96 season. He scored his first and only goal in the Football League on 30 March, in a 4–1 defeat to Wycombe Wanderers at Adams Park. After failing to make an appearance for Brentford on loan in March 1997, Mahorn returned to "Spurs" in time for a run of three games in September 1997, one in the League Cup against Carlisle United (in which he scored) and two in the Premier League. He left White Hart Lane after an FA Cup encounter with Fulham on 5 January 1998. He signed with John Rudge's Port Vale in March 1998 but only played one game in the First Division and was not signed for the 1998–99 season. He later had brief spells with Stevenage Borough (Conference), Cambridge City (Southern League) and Cambridge United before the former top-flight player disappeared off the football scene.

== Career statistics ==
Appearances and goals by club, season and competition
Club	Season	League			FA Cup		Other		Total	
Club	Season	Division	Apps	Goals	Apps	Goals	Apps	Goals	Apps	Goals
Tottenham Hotspur	1991–92	First Division	0	0	0	0	0	0	0	0
Tottenham Hotspur	1992–93	Premier League	0	0	0	0	0	0	0	0
Tottenham Hotspur	1993–94	Premier League	1	0	0	0	0	0	1	0
Tottenham Hotspur	1994–95	Premier League	0	0	0	0	0	0	0	0
Tottenham Hotspur	1995–96	Premier League	0	0	0	0	1	0	1	0
Tottenham Hotspur	1996–97	Premier League	0	0	0	0	0	0	0	0
Tottenham Hotspur	1997–98	Premier League	2	0	1	0	1	1	4	1
Tottenham Hotspur	Total		3	0	1	0	2	1	6	1
Fulham (loan)	1991–92	Second Division	3	0	0	0	1	0	4	0
Burnley (loan)	1995–96	Second Division	8	1	0	0	0	0	8	1
Brentford (loan)	1996–97	Second Division	0	0	0	0	0	0	0	0
Port Vale	1997–98	Second Division	1	0	0	0	0	0	1	0
