= Teddy Sheringham =

English footballer (born 1966)

Teddy Sheringham MBE
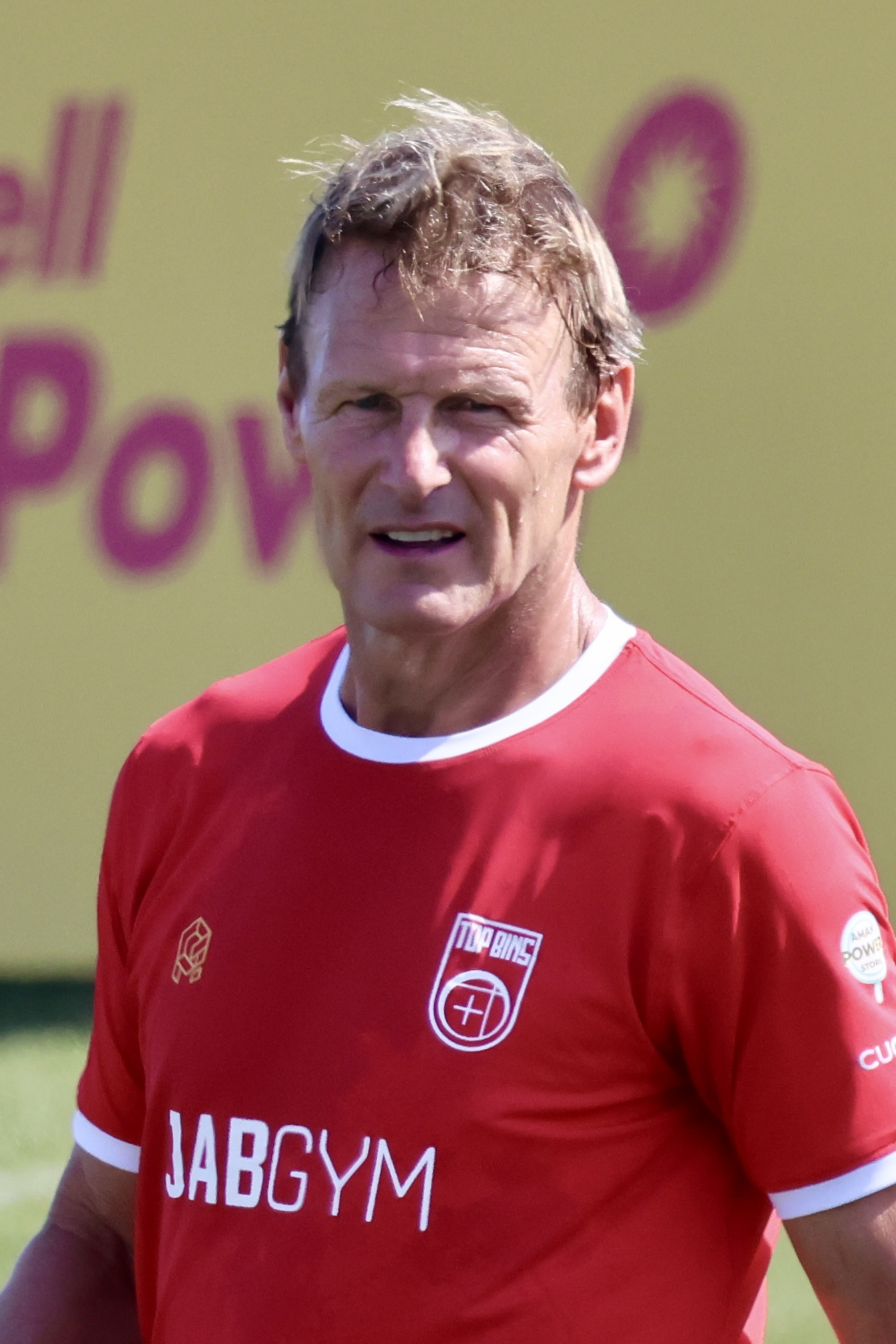
- Sheringham in 2024

Personal information
- Full name: Edward Paul Sheringham
- Date of birth: 2 April 1966 (age 60)
- Place of birth: Highams Park, London, England
- Height: 6 ft 1 in (1.85 m)
- Position: Striker

Youth career
- 1982–1983: Leytonstone & Ilford

Senior career*
Years	Team	Apps	(Gls)
1983–1991	Millwall	220	(93)
1985	→ Aldershot (loan)	5	(0)
1985	→ Djurgårdens IF (loan)	21	(13)
1991–1992	Nottingham Forest	42	(14)
1992–1997	Tottenham Hotspur	166	(75)
1997–2001	Manchester United	104	(31)
2001–2003	Tottenham Hotspur	70	(22)
2003–2004	Portsmouth	32	(9)
2004–2007	West Ham United	76	(28)
2007–2008	Colchester United	19	(3)
2015	Stevenage	0	(0)
Total		755	(288)

International career
1983	England U17	3	(0)
1983–1985	England Youth	8	(5)
1988	England U21	1	(0)
1993–2002	England	51	(11)

Managerial career
- 2015–2016: Stevenage
- 2017–2018: ATK
- * Club domestic league appearances and goals

Edward Paul Sheringham (born 2 April 1966) is an English football manager and former player. He played as a forward, mostly as a second striker, in a 24-year professional career. Sheringham was part of the Manchester United team that won the treble of the Premier League, FA Cup and UEFA Champions League in 1999. He scored the equalising goal and provided the assist for the club's winning goal in the 1999 UEFA Champions League final against Bayern Munich that sealed it, with both goals coming in injury time of the second half.

Sheringham began his career at Millwall, where he scored 111 goals between 1983 and 1991, and is the club's second all-time leading scorer. He left to join First Division Nottingham Forest. A year later, Sheringham scored Forest's first ever Premier League goal, and was signed by Tottenham Hotspur. After five seasons at Spurs, Sheringham joined Manchester United where he won three Premier League titles, the FA Cup, the UEFA Champions League, the Intercontinental Cup and the FA Charity Shield. In 2001, he was named both the PFA Players' Player of the Year and FWA Footballer of the Year.

After leaving Manchester United at the end of the 2000–01 season, Sheringham re-joined Tottenham Hotspur, where he was a losing finalist in the 2001–02 Football League Cup. He spent one season at newly promoted Portsmouth, scoring the club's first Premier League goal, before joining West Ham United, where he helped the club gain promotion from the 2004–05 Football League Championship. The following season, Sheringham appeared for West Ham in the 2006 FA Cup final, becoming the third-oldest player to appear in an FA Cup final.

Sheringham is currently the thirteenth-highest goalscorer in the history of the Premier League with 146 goals, and is the competition's 34th-highest appearance maker. He holds the record as the oldest outfield player to appear in a Premier League match (40 years, 272 days) and the oldest player to score in a Premier League match (40 years, 268 days). He was capped 51 times for the England national team, scoring 11 times, and played in the 1998 and 2002 FIFA World Cups, as well as the 1996 UEFA European Championship. He retired from competitive football at the end of the 2007–08 season with Colchester United, at the age of 42. Overall, he made over 1,000 appearances in his career.

After retirement, he has managed League Two club Stevenage, and ATK of the Indian Super League.

== Club career ==
=== Millwall ===
Sheringham began his professional career at Millwall in 1982 at the age of 16, after impressing a scout when playing for non-league club Leytonstone & Ilford during a youth team game against Millwall. He was signed up, initially as an apprentice and scored on only his second appearance for the club in a match away at Bournemouth in January 1984. After being loaned out by the club twice in 1985 to Aldershot and later a Swedish side, Djurgården, he quickly became a first choice selection at Millwall and during the late 1980s formed a striking partnership with Tony Cascarino. He was the club's top goalscorer in four seasons (1986–87, 1987–88, 1988–89 and 1990–91) and played in every game of the season twice, in 1986–87 and 1990–91.

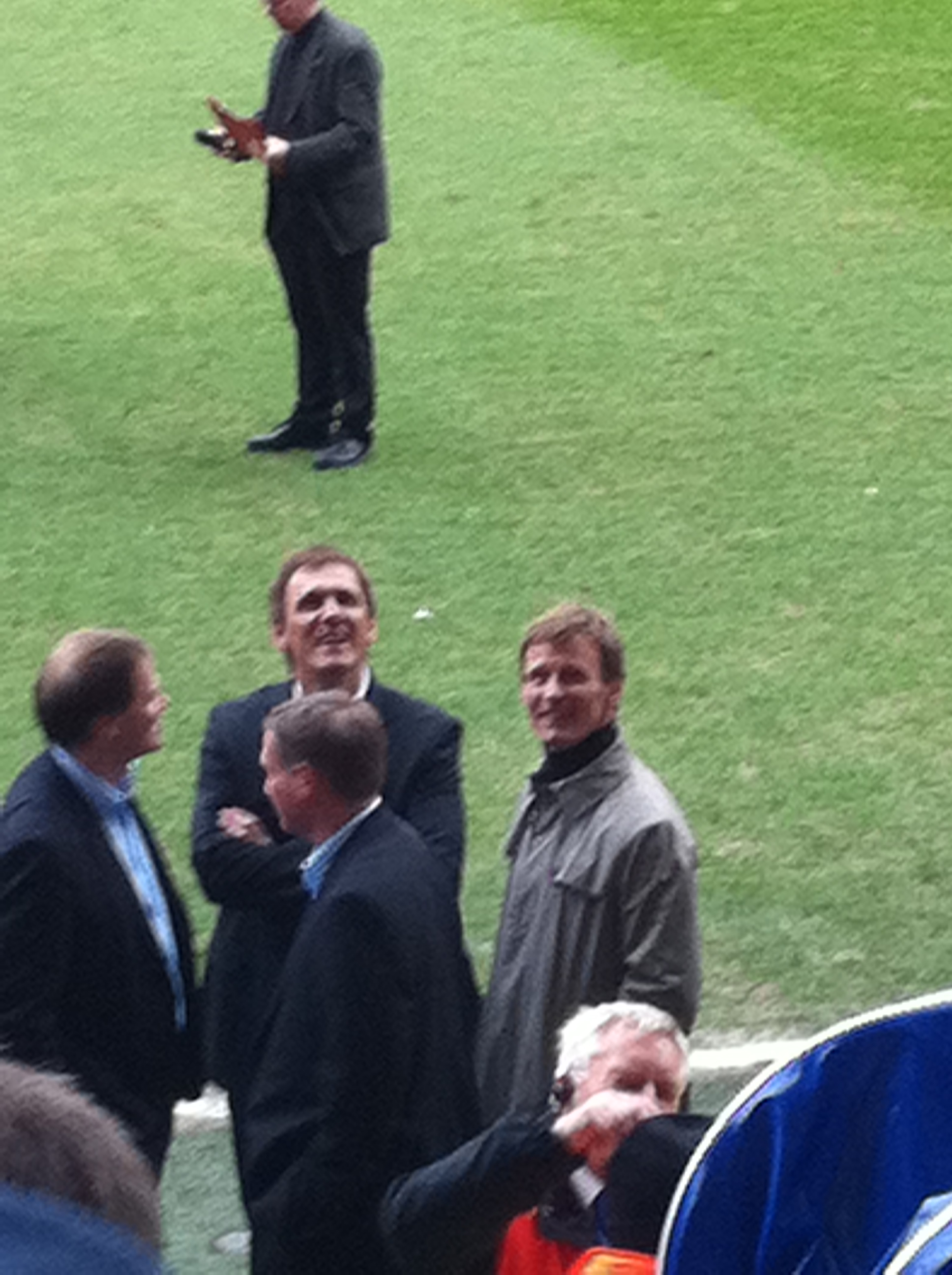
In their three seasons together at Millwall, Cascarino and Sheringham scored 99 goals between them.

The 1987–88 season saw the club promoted to the First Division, then the highest tier of English league football, for the first time. Sheringham scored the first goal in Millwall's first home game in Division One. Millwall briefly topped the table at the start of October 1988 and the goals of Sheringham (15) and Cascarino (15) kept Millwall in the top four for most of the season before fading after Easter to finish in 10th position. Sheringham said in his autobiography: "It was a crazy exhilarating time. There we were, little Millwall, in our first season in the First Division and topping the table until about March. Everybody said it couldn't last and of course it couldn't and it didn't, but we gave them all a good run for their money. We were beating the best teams when we shouldn't and getting away draws to which we had no right."

Millwall's spell in the top flight was not to last as they were relegated in the following season, finishing bottom of the Division after briefly topping the table again early in the season. Sheringham was again top scorer for Millwall with twelve goals, having missed ten league games through injury. The club had an opportunity to bounce straight back up at the end of the 1990–91 season, reaching the semi-finals of the Division Two play-offs, but they were beaten by Brighton & Hove Albion and remained in the Second Division. Sheringham's outstanding form during the 1990–91 season saw him finish as the league's highest scorer with 37 goals, a haul which included four hat-tricks. With Millwall failing to return to the top flight, a departure for Sheringham looked inevitable. In his final season at Millwall, Sheringham broke all of the club's goalscoring records, scoring a total of 111 goals in all competitions in his eight years at the club. He was Millwall's all-time leading scorer until 2009.

=== Nottingham Forest ===
The 25-year-old Sheringham was sold to Nottingham Forest in a £2 million deal in July 1991, to play alongside Nigel Clough. He did well for Forest and helped them finish eighth in the First Division at the end of the 1991–92 season, as well as to reach the League Cup final, where they lost to Manchester United. Sheringham scored Forest's first Premier League goal, against Liverpool, in August 1992 (which was also the first ever live goal shown on Sky Sports) but a week later he was sold to Tottenham Hotspur for £2.1 million. Forest went on to be relegated in 1992–93, in part due to having failed to adequately replace Sheringham in attack.

=== Tottenham Hotspur ===
Sheringham had a successful start to his career at the club by being the Premier League's top goalscorer in its inaugural season, scoring 22 goals (21 with Tottenham and one with Forest). His strike partners at White Hart Lane included Gordon Durie, Ronny Rosenthal, Jürgen Klinsmann and finally Chris Armstrong. In the 1993–94 season, he was Tottenham's top scorer with 14 Premier League goals but played in just 19 games due to injury and this impacted negatively on Tottenham's league form. Spurs finished 15th and were not completely safe from relegation until the penultimate game of the season.

The following season was better, as he helped Spurs finish seventh in the Premier League and reach the semi-final of the FA Cup, just missing out on European football for the 1995–96 season.

Jürgen Klinsmann, who partnered Sheringham during the 1994–95 season, was later quoted as claiming that Sheringham was the 'most intelligent strike partner' he had ever had.

Sheringham was hugely popular with the Tottenham fans and by the mid-1990s was firmly established as one of the most highly rated strikers in the Premier League. However, despite his prolific strike rate by the end of the 1996–97 season, he was 31 years old and had yet to win a major trophy in a career which had so far spanned 15 years; many pundits considered him past his best and likely to finish his career without major honours.

=== Manchester United ===
In June 1997, Sheringham agreed to join Manchester United in a £3.5 million deal. There was a significant gap upfront following the unexpected early retirement of Eric Cantona. His first competitive game for the club was against Chelsea in the 1997 FA Charity Shield which United won on penalties. His first league outing was against his former employers, Tottenham, at White Hart Lane. Throughout the game, Sheringham suffered jeers and boos from his former fans, who had been angered by the fact that Sheringham had accused Tottenham of lacking ambition when he made his transfer. In the 60th minute with the score at 0–0, Sheringham missed a penalty, although ended up on the winning side as two late goals gave United the win.

Sheringham scored 14 goals in all competitions and formed a good partnership with Andy Cole but the 1997–98 season ended without the league title. Towards the end of the season, during a game at Bolton Wanderers, an incident occurred that furthered the animosity with fellow striker Andy Cole. When Bolton scored, Sheringham blamed Cole, his strike partner and Cole then refused to talk to him. The breakdown in their relationship was never resolved, and reputedly they never spoke again. This had started three years previously in 1995 when Sheringham had snubbed Cole as the latter came on to make his international debut.

Speculation that Sheringham would leave United increased just after the 1998–99 season got underway, when Dwight Yorke moved to Old Trafford from Aston Villa. Yorke immediately formed a prolific partnership with Cole as United went on to regain the league title on the final day of the season. Sheringham's first-team chances were relatively limited but he still managed to make enough appearances to qualify for a championship medal at the end of the season – at the age of 33 he had won his first major trophy. A week later he came off the substitutes bench to score United's opening goal in a 2–0 defeat of Newcastle United in the FA Cup final to secure the double. Four days after the FA Cup triumph, Sheringham scored a dramatic stoppage-time equaliser against Bayern Munich in the Champions League final, having come on as a substitute earlier in the game. With seconds of stoppage-time remaining, Ole Gunnar Solskjær scored from Sheringham's headed flick-on, and United won a treble of the Premier League, FA Cup and European Cup with Sheringham – having not won a major honour in his 15-year career – now having won every top-level trophy in the English game.

Sheringham's first-team chances remained limited during the 1999–2000 season, but he still played enough times to merit another Premier League title medal. In the 2000–01 season, United secured a third consecutive league title, with Sheringham top-scoring for United and playing some of the best football of his career. In April 2001, he was voted Footballer of the Year by both the Professional Footballers' Association and Football Writers' Association. His fine form ensured that he was still involved with the national side despite being in his 35th year, being named in the squad for the 2002 World Cup.

=== Return to Tottenham Hotspur ===
At the end of the 2000–01 season, Sheringham's four-year contract at Old Trafford expired. He was facing stiffer competition than ever for the places up front, most of all from United's new Dutch striker Ruud van Nistelrooy. He refused United's offer of a 12-month contract and returned to Tottenham on a free transfer as one of new manager Glenn Hoddle's first signings. In his first season back, Sheringham helped Tottenham to a ninth-place finish, the club's highest in six years, and to reach the League Cup final where they lost 2–1 to Blackburn Rovers, with Sheringham being brought down in the penalty area in the last minute for what he believed to be a penalty. 2002–03 brought a similar mid table finish, although Tottenham had topped the Premier League three games into the season. Sheringham made 80 appearances in all competitions for Tottenham in this period, scoring 26 goals.

Sheringham was inducted into the Tottenham Hotspur Hall of Fame alongside Clive Allen on 8 May 2008.

=== Portsmouth ===
On the expiry of his Tottenham contract at the end of the 2002–03 season, Tottenham decided not to offer Sheringham a new contract and he joined Portsmouth in their first season in the Premier League. Sheringham became the oldest Premier League player to score a hat-trick when he scored three against Bolton early in the season. Despite this, he was only contracted to the club for one season and, despite scoring in his final game (a 5–1 win victory over Middlesbrough with the club already secure in the top flight), at the end of the 2003–04 season, Portsmouth decided not to offer the 38-year-old striker another contract but he insisted that he wanted to continue his top flight career at another club. Sheringham made 38 appearances for Portsmouth, scoring ten goals.

=== West Ham United ===
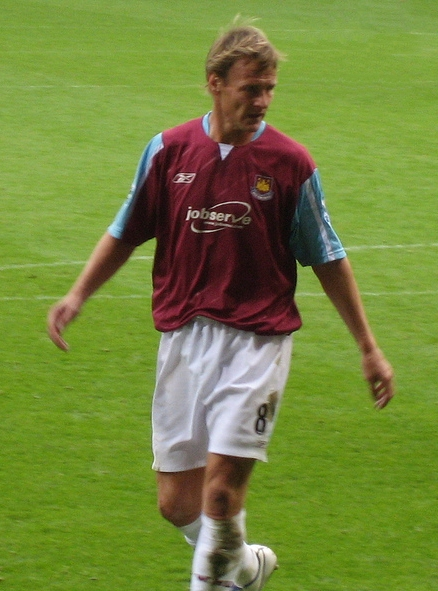
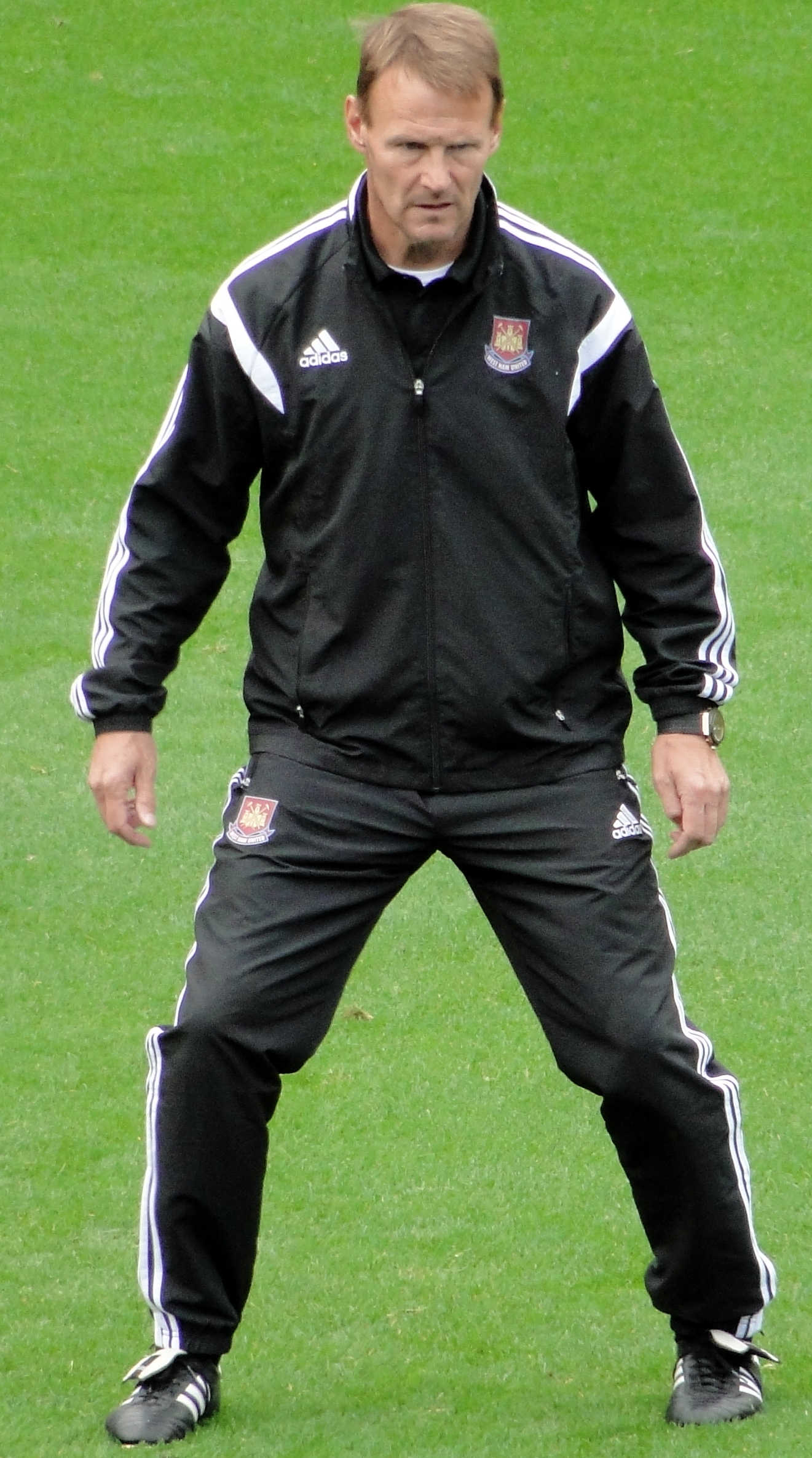
Teddy Sheringham as a West Ham United player and coach

Sheringham then dropped down a division to the Championship to sign for West Ham United, the club he supported as a boy. Sheringham was the division's third-highest scorer in the 2004–05 season with 20 goals (21 in all competitions) – one of the highest goalscoring seasons of his career. He won the Championship Player of the Season award, and helped the Hammers reach the 2005 Football League Championship play-off final where they beat Preston North End at the Millennium Stadium to return to the Premier League after two seasons in the second tier. At the end of the 2004–05 season, Sheringham's one-year contract expired and both he and West Ham agreed to a one-year extension prior to the start of the new season. With his second-half appearance against Charlton Athletic on 2 April 2006, Sheringham became one of just five players to have played top-flight football while in their 40s; joining the likes of Les Sealey, John Burridge, Gordon Strachan and later Ryan Giggs. On 19 August 2006, he became the oldest outfield player in the history of the division, at 40 years 139 days. Sheringham signed a contract to play for West Ham until the end of the 2006–07 season, and was a player at the club after his 41st birthday. On 13 May 2006, Sheringham became the third oldest player to appear in an FA Cup final, at 40 years and 41 days old. The game ended 3–3, with Liverpool winning the trophy in a penalty shootout. Sheringham was the only West Ham player to convert his kick as Liverpool won the shootout 3–1. On 26 December 2006, at the age of 40 years and 266 days, he beat his own record for oldest Premier League scorer, with the goal in a 2–1 defeat to Portsmouth. On 30 December 2006, he broke the record for oldest Premier League outfield player once more, playing in the 1–0 defeat against Manchester City, aged 40 years and 270 days. Sheringham also appeared in 11 FA Cup, League Cup, and UEFA Cup games for West Ham, scoring two goals.

=== Colchester United ===
After being released by West Ham, Sheringham signed for Colchester United in July 2007 and was given the number 8 shirt. He started Colchester's first game of the season, away at Sheffield United, and scored the first goal in a 2–2 home draw against Barnsley a week later. 7 days later he scored again, in a 3–0 win at Preston North End. Having just served a three match suspension after being sent off against Coventry, Sheringham was once again amongst the scorers in Colchester's 2–1 win at Hillsborough over Sheffield Wednesday. He scored his fourth and final Colchester goal in a 3–1 FA Cup defeat to Peterborough United on 5 January 2008. Sheringham made only 3 league appearances in 2008, the last of which came against Stoke City on 26 April 2008, the last game at Layer Road.

Whilst at Colchester, Sheringham was the oldest player in all four divisions of the Football League, and is now part of the elite list of players who have achieved more than 700 league appearances in their career. He retired at the end of the 2007–08 season, his career ending on a low note as Colchester were relegated from the Championship – the club's first relegation for 18 years.

== International career ==
Something of a late developer on the international scene, Sheringham did not win his first England cap until the age of 27 in 1993. Under the reign of manager Terry Venables (1994–96) Sheringham came to be the preferred strike partner for Alan Shearer. During this time, England had a wealth of strikers with the likes of Andy Cole, Ian Wright, a young Robbie Fowler and Les Ferdinand all battling to partner Shearer in the England team.

The two formed a famous partnership at international level, as they complemented each other's strengths: Shearer the out-and-out goalscorer, big, strong and powerful, Sheringham just 'dropping off' his strike partner, finding spaces, creating play and providing key passes, forming the link between Shearer and the England midfield. The pairing came to be known as 'The SAS' ('Shearer and Sheringham') and their most successful time together came in Euro 96, held in England. Their most famous contribution was in the 4–1 victory over the Netherlands, a game in the opening group stages in which they both scored twice against one of the strongest teams in the tournament. Though England were eventually knocked out in the semi-finals, many believed that that squad of players such as Sheringham and his contemporaries including Paul Gascoigne, Steve McManaman, Tony Adams and Paul Ince, had done the nation proud. At this time, the England squad were also criticised heavily in the media for their part in several off the field incidents during the lead up to the tournament, where Sheringham, McManaman and Gascoigne were photographed drinking heavily and playing "dentist chair" drinking games as well as destroying the first class cabin of a Cathay Pacific flight which went down poorly with the public.

Sheringham continued to be a first choice selection under new England manager Glenn Hoddle (1996–99) until the emergence of new teenage superstar Michael Owen during the course of 1998 saw him overshadowed. Although Sheringham began the 1998 FIFA World Cup as a starting player with Owen on the bench, after Owen replaced him and almost turned around a defeat against Romania in England's second game of the tournament, it seemed likely that Sheringham's front line international career had come to an end.

He was not selected at all for UEFA Euro 2000 by then manager Kevin Keegan, but the retirement of Shearer (despite being four years younger than Sheringham) from international football after that tournament and the arrival of new manager Sven-Göran Eriksson in 2001 saw a return to international favour for him. He was often deployed as a tactical substitute late in games by Eriksson, valued for his ability to hold the ball up and create intelligent play. In 2001, Sheringham scored an important goal for England against Greece in a World Cup qualifying match within 15 seconds of coming on as a substitute, although this event is overshadowed by the 93rd minute equalising free-kick by David Beckham.

He was selected as part of Eriksson's 2002 FIFA World Cup squad after impressing throughout the 2001–02 season with his club, and played in the famous 1–0 win against Argentina, almost scoring a goal with a volley that was well saved by the Argentine goalkeeper, and made his final England appearance as a substitute in the 2–1 quarter-final defeat to Brazil in Japan. His twelve appearances for Eriksson were all as a substitute.

At the age of 36, that defeat signalled the final end of Sheringham's international career, during which he had earned fifty-one caps and scored eleven times for England.

== Style of play ==
A versatile forward, Sheringham was capable of playing as a striker and also as a supporting forward, courtesy of his ability both to score and create goals. Due to his vision, his ability to read the game, and his short passing ability, Sheringham was capable of playing off another striker, in a deeper, creative role, where he served as an assist provider, in particular in later years, as he lost pace and stamina. He also possessed good technical ability and upper body strength, which allowed him to retain possession in the box and hold up the ball when playing with his back to goal, and subsequently lay it off to his teammates. As a centre-forward in his prime, he was also very effective and extremely prolific, due to his accurate finishing, opportunism in the area, intelligence, and his ability in the air, which enabled him to be regarded as one of the top Premier League forwards of his generation.

== Poker career ==
Upon his retirement from professional football in 2008, Sheringham has been a noticeable figure on the world poker scene, playing in various competitions worldwide. In 2010, he made the final table in the €5,000 No Limit Hold'em Main Event in the EPT Vilamoura, finishing 5th out of a field of 384 players, winning €93,121.

== Coaching career ==
In May 2014, Sheringham was appointed as an attacking coach with West Ham United. He was credited with a change in West Ham's style of play which led to a run of good form at the start of the 2014–15 season, earning striker Diafra Sakho the Premier League Player of the Month award for October 2014.

On 21 May 2015, Sheringham was appointed to his first managerial role, taking charge of League Two side Stevenage, replacing Graham Westley. With the club struggling with injuries, he registered himself as a player, aged 49, for a Herts Senior Cup match against Welwyn Garden City in November of that year, but did not play. He was sacked on 1 February 2016, with the club 19th in the league having collected only three points from their previous eight matches.

On 14 July 2017, Sheringham was named as the new head coach of Indian Super League club ATK. On 24 January 2018, Sheringham was sacked by ATK after winning only three of his ten games in charge of the Kolkata-based outfit.

== Personal life ==
Sheringham's son Charlie, born in 1988, also became a professional footballer. The two made the FA Cup third round draw together in December 2013. Sheringham has two more children with Kristina Andriotis, whom he married in 2016. Earlier in his life, he dated models Danielle Lloyd and Katie Price.

Since 2005, Sheringham has resided in Sewardstonebury, Essex, just north of the border between Essex and Waltham Forest. He named his house Nou Camp in reference to the stadium that hosted the 1999 UEFA Champions League Final, stating "I had a house built in 2005 and at the end, when it was finished, it was the perfect house, so I called it Camp Nou after that fantastic night."

In 2007, Sheringham was awarded an MBE at that year's Birthday Honours for services to football.

In 2020, Sheringham competed on the first British series of The Masked Singer, masked as "Tree".

== Career statistics ==
=== Club ===
Appearances and goals by club, season and competition
Club	Season	League			FA Cup		League Cup		Europe		Other		Total	
Club	Season	Division	Apps	Goals	Apps	Goals	Apps	Goals	Apps	Goals	Apps	Goals	Apps	Goals
Millwall	1983–84	Third Division	7	1	0	0	0	0	—		3 (Note: Appearances in Associate Members' Cup)	1	10	2
Millwall	1984–85	Third Division	0	0	0	0	1	0	—		—		1	0
Millwall	1985–86	Second Division	18	4	0	0	0	0	—		0	0	18	4
Millwall	1986–87	Second Division	42	13	3	0	3	2	—		2 (Note: Appearances in Full Members' Cup)	1	50	16
Millwall	1987–88	Second Division	43	22	1	0	4	0	—		3	2	51	24
Millwall	1988–89	First Division	33	11	2	1	3	3	—		2	0	40	15
Millwall	1989–90	First Division	31	9	3	2	3	1	—		0	0	37	12
Millwall	1990–91	Second Division	46	33	3	2	3	2	—		3 (Note: One appearance and one goal in Full Members' Cup, two in Second Division play-offs)	1	55	38
Millwall	Total		220	93	12	5	17	8	—		13	5	262	111
Aldershot (loan)	1984–85	Fourth Division	5	0	—		—		—		1	0	6	0
Djurgården (loan)	1985	Division 2 Norra	21	13	—		—		—		3 (Note: Two appearances and one goal in Division 2 (Swedish football) play-offs, one in Svenska Cupen)	1	24	14
Nottingham Forest	1991–92	First Division	39	13	4	2	10	5	—		6	2	59	22
Nottingham Forest	1992–93	Premier League	3	1	—		—		—		—		3	1
Nottingham Forest	Total		42	14	4	2	10	5	—		6	2	62	23
Tottenham Hotspur	1992–93	Premier League	38	21	5	4	4	3	—		—		47	28
Tottenham Hotspur	1993–94	Premier League	19	13	0	0	2	2	—		—		21	15
Tottenham Hotspur	1994–95	Premier League	42	18	6	4	2	1	—		—		50	23
Tottenham Hotspur	1995–96	Premier League	38	16	6	5	3	3	0	0	—		47	24
Tottenham Hotspur	1996–97	Premier League	29	7	0	0	3	1	—		—		32	8
Tottenham Hotspur	Total		166	75	17	13	14	10	0	0	—		197	98
Manchester United	1997–98	Premier League	31	9	3	3	—		7 (Note: Appearances in UEFA Champions League)	2	1 (Note: Appearance in Charity Shield)	0	42	14
Manchester United	1998–99	Premier League	17	2	4	1	1	1	4	1	1	0	27	5
Manchester United	1999–2000	Premier League	27	5	—		0	0	9	1	5 (Note: One appearance in UEFA Super Cup, one in Charity Shield, one in Intercontinental Cup, two in FIFA Club World Cup)	0	41	6
Manchester United	2000–01	Premier League	29	15	2	1	0	0	11	5	1	0	43	21
Manchester United	Total		104	31	9	5	1	1	31	9	8	0	153	46
Tottenham Hotspur	2001–02	Premier League	34	10	2	1	6	2	—		—		42	13
Tottenham Hotspur	2002–03	Premier League	36	12	1	0	1	1	—		—		38	13
Tottenham Hotspur	Total		70	22	3	1	7	3	—		—		80	26
Portsmouth	2003–04	Premier League	32	9	3	1	3	0	—		—		38	10
West Ham United	2004–05	Championship	33	20	2	1	1	0	—		0	0	36	21
West Ham United	2005–06	Premier League	26	6	4	1	1	0	—		—		31	7
West Ham United	2006–07	Premier League	17	2	1	0	1	0	1 (Note: Appearances in UEFA Cup)	0	—		20	2
West Ham United	Total		76	28	7	2	3	0	1	0	0	0	87	30
Colchester United	2007–08	Championship	19	3	1	1	0	0	—		—		20	4
Career total			755	288	56	30	55	27	32	9	31	8	929	362

=== International ===
Appearances and goals by national team and year
National team	Year	Apps	Goals
England	1993	2	0
England	1994	3	0
England	1995	7	2
England	1996	9	3
England	1997	8	3
England	1998	8	1
England	1999	1	0
England	2000	1	0
England	2001	4	2
England	2002	8	0
Total		51	11

Scores and results list England's goal tally first, score column indicates score after each Sheringham goal.

List of international goals scored by Teddy Sheringham
No.	Date	Venue	Cap	Opponent	Score	Result	Competition
1	8 June 1995	Elland Road, Leeds, United Kingdom	8	Sweden	1–2	3–3	Umbro Cup
2	15 November 1995	Wembley Stadium, London, United Kingdom	12	Switzerland	2–0	3–1	Friendly
3	18 June 1996	Wembley Stadium, London, United Kingdom	18	Netherlands	2–0	4–1	UEFA Euro 1996
4	18 June 1996	Wembley Stadium, London, United Kingdom	18	Netherlands	4–0	4–1	UEFA Euro 1996
5	9 November 1996	Boris Paichadze Stadium, Tbilisi, Georgia	21	Georgia	1–0	2–0	1998 FIFA World Cup qualification
6	29 March 1997	Wembley Stadium, London, United Kingdom	22	Mexico	1–0	2–0	Friendly
7	30 April 1997	Wembley Stadium, London, United Kingdom	23	Georgia	1–0	2–0	1998 FIFA World Cup qualification
8	31 May 1997	Stadion Śląski, Chorzów, Poland	25	Poland	2–0	2–0	1998 FIFA World Cup qualification
9	22 April 1998	Wembley Stadium, London, United Kingdom	32	Portugal	2–0	3–0	Friendly
10	25 May 2001	Pride Park, Derby, United Kingdom	41	Mexico	4–0	4–0	Friendly
11	6 October 2001	Old Trafford, Manchester, United Kingdom	42	Greece	1–1	2–2	2002 FIFA World Cup qualification

== Managerial statistics ==
As of match played 12 January 2018.

Managerial record by team and tenure
Team	From	To	Record				
Team	From	To	P	W	D	L	Win %
West Ham							
Stevenage	21 May 2015	1 February 2016	33	7	10	16	21.2
Wycombe Wanderers							
ATK	14 July 2017	24 January 2018	10	3	3	4	30.0
Total			43	10	13	20	23.3

== Honours ==
Djurgården

- Division 2 Norra: 1985

Millwall

- Football League Second Division: 1987–88
- Football League Group Cup: 1982–83

Nottingham Forest

- Full Members' Cup: 1991–92
- Football League Cup runner-up: 1991–92

Manchester United

- Premier League: 1998–99, 1999–2000, 2000–01
- FA Cup: 1998–99
- FA Charity Shield: 1997
- UEFA Champions League: 1998–99
- Intercontinental Cup: 1999

Tottenham Hotspur

- Football League Cup runner-up: 2001–02

West Ham United

- Football League Championship play-offs: 2005
- FA Cup runner-up: 2005–06

England

- Tournoi de France: 1997

Individual

- Premier League Golden Boot: 1992–93
- Premier League Player of the Month: October 2000, August 2003
- PFA Team of the Year: 2000–01 Premier League
- PFA Players' Player of the Year: 2000–01
- FWA Footballer of the Year: 2000–01
- Sir Matt Busby Player of the Year: 2000–01
- West Ham United Hammer of the Year: 2004–05
- English Football Hall of Fame: 2009
- Millwall Player of the Year: 1990–91
- Tottenham Hotspur Player of the Year: 1994–95
