= Owen Coll =

Irish footballer (born 1976)

Personal information
- Full name: Owen Oliver Coll
- Date of birth: 9 April 1976 (age 50)
- Place of birth: Donegal, Ireland
- Position: Central defender

Senior career*
Years	Team	Apps	(Gls)
1993–1994	Enfield		
1994–1996	Tottenham Hotspur	0	(0)
1995	→ Yeovil Town (loan)	2	(0)
1996–1998	AFC Bournemouth	24	(0)
1998	Yeovil Town	0	(0)
1998	Stevenage Borough		
1998–2002	Aldershot Town	132	(14)
2002–2003	Grays Athletic		
2003–2004	Hitchin Town		
2004	Cheshunt		

International career
	Republic of Ireland U21	3	(0)
- * Club domestic league appearances and goals

Owen Oliver Coll (born 9 April 1976) is an Irish former professional footballer who played as a central defender.

== Career ==
=== Club career ===
After playing non-League football with Enfield, Coll signed for Tottenham Hotspur in 1994. After two seasons with Tottenham, which included making 3 European appearances and a loan spell at Yeovil Town, Coll moved to AFC Bournemouth, where he made a total of 24 appearances in the Football League. Coll later returned to non-League football, playing for Yeovil Town, Stevenage Borough, Aldershot Town, Grays Athletic, Hitchin Town and Cheshunt.

Coll retired from football in the summer of 2004.

=== International career ===
Coll earned three caps for the Irish under-21 team.
