= Steve Slade =

English footballer

Personal information
- Full name: Steven Anthony Slade
- Date of birth: 6 October 1975 (age 51)
- Place of birth: Romford, England
- Height: 5 ft 11 in (1.80 m)
- Position: Striker

Youth career
- Tottenham Hotspur

Senior career*
Years	Team	Apps	(Gls)
1994–1996	Tottenham Hotspur	5	(0)
1996–2000	Queens Park Rangers	69	(6)
1997	→ Brentford (loan)	4	(0)
2000	Cambridge United	9	(3)
2001	Chesham United	3	(0)
2001	Hayes	2	(0)
2001	Harrow Borough	1	(0)
2002	St Albans City	2	(0)
2005	Vikingur		
2005	Barking	4	(0)
2005	Redbridge	1	(0)
2005	Grimsby Town	0	(0)
2006	Worthing	2	(0)
2006	Chesham United	7	(2)
- Maidenhead United
	Barking	2	(2)
2008	Ware	3	(0)
Total		114	(13)

International career
1996	England U21	4	(3)
- * Club domestic league appearances and goals

Steven Anthony Slade (born 6 October 1975) is an English former professional footballer who played as a striker, notably in the Premier League for Tottenham Hotspur and earned four caps, scoring three times for the England U21 team.

He also played as a professional in the Football League for Queens Park Rangers, Brentford, Cambridge United and Grimsby Town, as well as appearing in the Icelandic top flight 1. deild karla for Vikingur. He has also played non-League football for Hayes, Maidenhead United, Barking and Ware.

== Club career ==
Slade began his career in the youth teams of Tottenham Hotspur, turning professional at the club for the 1994–95 season. He made his debut the following season in a Football League Cup tie against Chester City in October 1995, before making his league bow two months later against Wimbledon. However, unable to establish himself at White Hart Lane, Slade joined newly relegated Queens Park Rangers in the summer of 1996 after manager Ray Wilkins paid Spurs £350,000 for the player. Slade remained at Loftus Road for over four seasons, although made more substitute appearances than starts at the club and also spent time on loan at Brentford. Released in 2000, he had a short, undistinguished spell at Cambridge United, before dropping into non-league football with Chesham United, followed by short spells with Hayes, Harrow Borough and St Albans City. Slade also trialled with league sides Leyton Orient and Scunthorpe United during the 2001–02 season.

Following his release from Hayes, Slade briefly played football in Iceland. A trial at Grimsby Town followed and, although ultimately he did not land a contract, Slade featured in one game, appearing against Morecambe in the Football League Trophy. During the 2005–06 season, he appeared in non-league football with Barking, Redbridge, Worthing and Chesham United. Slade later reemerged with Maidenhead United, before a second spell with Barking.

== International career ==
In the summer of 1996, immediately prior to his move from Spurs to QPR, Slade was selected for the England under-21 side that took part in the annual Toulon Tournament in France. Slade featured in four games in all, appearing against Belgium, Angola, Portugal and Brazil, although this was to be his sole taste of the international game.
