= Stuart Nethercott =

English footballer and manager

Personal information
- Full name: Stuart David Nethercott
- Date of birth: 21 March 1973 (age 53)
- Place of birth: Ilford, England
- Position: Defender

Youth career
- ?–1991: Tottenham Hotspur

Senior career*
Years	Team	Apps	(Gls)
1991–1998	Tottenham Hotspur	53	(0)
1991–1992	→ Maidstone United (loan)	13	(1)
1992	→ Barnet (loan)	3	(0)
1998	→ Millwall (loan)	6	(0)
1998–2004	Millwall	211	(10)
2004	→ Wycombe Wanderers (loan)	22	(1)
2004–2006	Wycombe Wanderers	29	(0)
2005–2006	→ Woking (loan)	33	(0)
2006–2007	Heybridge Swifts	19	(2)
2007–2008	Wivenhoe Town	20	(1)
2007–2008	Welling United	?	(?)
2008–2009	Wivenhoe Town	18	(0)

International career
1994–1995	England U21	8	(0)

Managerial career
- 2008–2009: Maldon Town
- 2011–2012: Ware
- 2020–2021: Heybridge Swifts
- 2021–2022: Coggeshall Town
- * Club domestic league appearances and goals as of 11:35, 12 October 2013 (UTC)

Stuart Nethercott (born 21 March 1973) is an English football manager and former professional footballer.

As a player, he was a defender who notably played in the Premier League for Tottenham Hotspur, and in the Football League with Barnet, Millwall and Wycombe Wanderers. He also played at non-league level for Maidstone United, Woking, Heybridge Swifts, Wivenhoe Town and Welling United. He was capped eight times at England U21 level.

Following retirement, Nethercott moved into management and has had spells in charge of Maldon Town, Ware, Heybridge Swifts and currently Coggeshall Town.

== Playing career ==
Nethercott grew up through the ranks at Tottenham Hotspur and made his debut on 20 March 1993 in a 1–1 draw at Chelsea.

He was sent on loan to Maidstone and Barnet for experience during the early 1990s and ultimately played 54 games for Spurs, playing in the side which reached the FA Cup semi-finals in 1995. Unfortunately, he was targeted by Everton as a weak link and was given a hiding as Everton romped to a 4–1 victory. He scored once for Tottenham, in a 3-0 FA Cup win over Altrincham in January 1995.

For a while it looked as though Nethercott would be the long-term successor to the ageing Gary Mabbutt, but by 1998 he had fallen out of favour in the first team and was transferred to Millwall. He helped them win the Division Two title in 2001 and reach their first-ever FA Cup final in 2004, but he was loaned out to Wycombe Wanderers for the latter part of the cup final season meaning he missed out on the final itself.

After the FA Cup final defeat, he signed for Wycombe Wanderers (where he scored once against Chesterfield), and later dropped into non-League football with Woking, Heybridge Swifts and Wivenhoe Town. He took a player/assistant manager role at Welling United in 2007, but when his managerial colleague Neil Smith was sacked, returned to Wivenhoe for a second spell.

== Managerial career ==
In September 2008, he was promoted from his position of Assistant Manager at Maldon Town to Caretaker Manager following the sacking of Russell Tanner, and has overseen an upturn in the club's fortunes managing three wins from his first four games in charge.

In June 2011, Nethercott was appointed first team manager at Ware and in July 2011 signed for the club as a player. He resigned a year and two days later, on 7 June 2012. In May 2020 he was appointed manager of Heybridge Swifts. In October 2021 he was appointed joint manager of Coggeshall Town alongside Karl Duguid. He left the club in May 2022.

== Honours ==
Millwall

- Football League Second Division: 2000–01
- Football League Trophy runner-up: 1998–99
