= Joe Cole =

English footballer (born 1981)

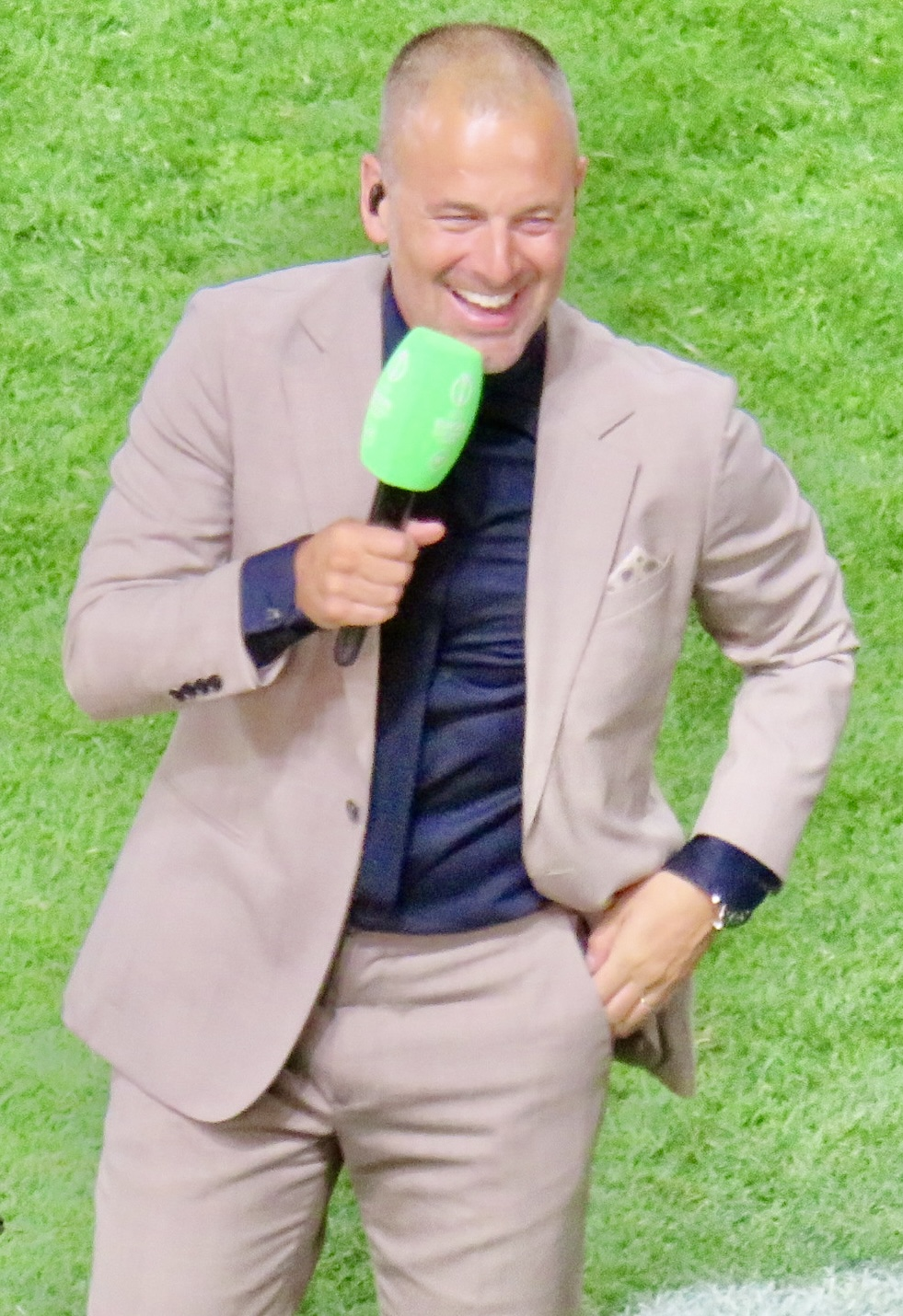
- Cole in 2023

Personal information
- Full name: Joseph John Cole
- Date of birth: 8 November 1981 (age 45)
- Place of birth: Paddington, London, England
- Height: 5 ft 9 in (1.75 m)
- Positions: Attacking midfielder; winger

Youth career
- Westward
- 1990–1998: West Ham United

Senior career*
Years	Team	Apps	(Gls)
1998–2003	West Ham United	126	(10)
2003–2010	Chelsea	183	(27)
2010–2013	Liverpool	26	(3)
2011–2012	→ Lille (loan)	32	(4)
2013–2014	West Ham United	31	(5)
2014–2016	Aston Villa	12	(1)
2015–2016	→ Coventry City (loan)	7	(1)
2016	Coventry City	15	(1)
2016–2018	Tampa Bay Rowdies	82	(20)
2021	Belstone	0	(0)
Total		514	(72)

International career
1997–1998	England U16	4	(0)
1999	England U18	5	(0)
2000–2003	England U21	8	(2)
2001–2010	England	56	(10)
- * Club domestic league appearances and goals

Joseph John Cole (born 8 November 1981) is an English professional football coach and former player who played as an attacking midfielder or winger. He was long touted as a child prodigy and as the hottest prospect in English football, with Manchester United reportedly offering to pay £10 million for his services as a 16-year-old.

Cole started his career with West Ham United, where, after breaking into the first team in January 1999, he played more than 120 Premier League games over five seasons. He was one of a number of players who left West Ham in the summer of 2003, after the club had been relegated to the Football League First Division, with Cole signing for Chelsea. He spent seven seasons at Chelsea, playing over 280 games in all competitions and winning seven trophies, including three Premier League titles, two FA Cups and a League Cup. He left Chelsea on a free transfer in July 2010 to join Liverpool, who a year later loaned him to Lille. After a season in France, he returned to Liverpool before re-joining West Ham in January 2013. He signed for Aston Villa in June 2014, then joined Coventry City on loan in October 2015, joining on a permanent deal in January 2016.

Capped by England at under-16, under-18 and under-21 level, Cole was a full international between 2001 and 2010, capped by the England national team on 56 occasions, scoring 10 goals. He was selected for the England squad at the 2002, 2006 and 2010 FIFA World Cups and UEFA Euro 2004.

After retirement in 2018, Cole took up a coaching role at Chelsea.

== Early life ==
Cole was born Joseph Rooks in Paddington, London, and lived there until he moved to Somers Town at the age of six.

== Club career ==
=== West Ham United ===
Cole is a product of the West Ham United youth system. Playing in a mould similar to former England favourite Paul Gascoigne, he progressed through the West Ham ranks and signed professional terms in November 1998 before making his first-team debut aged 17 on 2 January 1999 in an FA Cup third round tie against Swansea City. Eight days later he made his Premier League debut, away to Manchester United. In 1999, Cole was part of West Ham's victorious FA Youth Cup-winning squad (alongside Michael Carrick), defeating Coventry City 9–0 on aggregate in the final. Cole played only eight Premier League games in his first season but in the following season, he made 22 Premier League appearances, was a member of the West Ham team which won the 1999 UEFA Intertoto Cup, scored his first goal for West Ham, in a 3–2 League Cup win at Birmingham City on 30 November 1999 and scored his first Premier League goal, in a 5–4 home win against Bradford City, on 12 February 2000. In January 2003, then West Ham manager Glenn Roeder gave Cole the club captain's armband at the age of 21. Cole's last game for West Ham came on 11 May 2003 in a 2–2 draw with Birmingham City, a game which saw West Ham relegated from the Premier League. Cole won the "Hammer of the Year Award" for 2003.

=== Chelsea ===
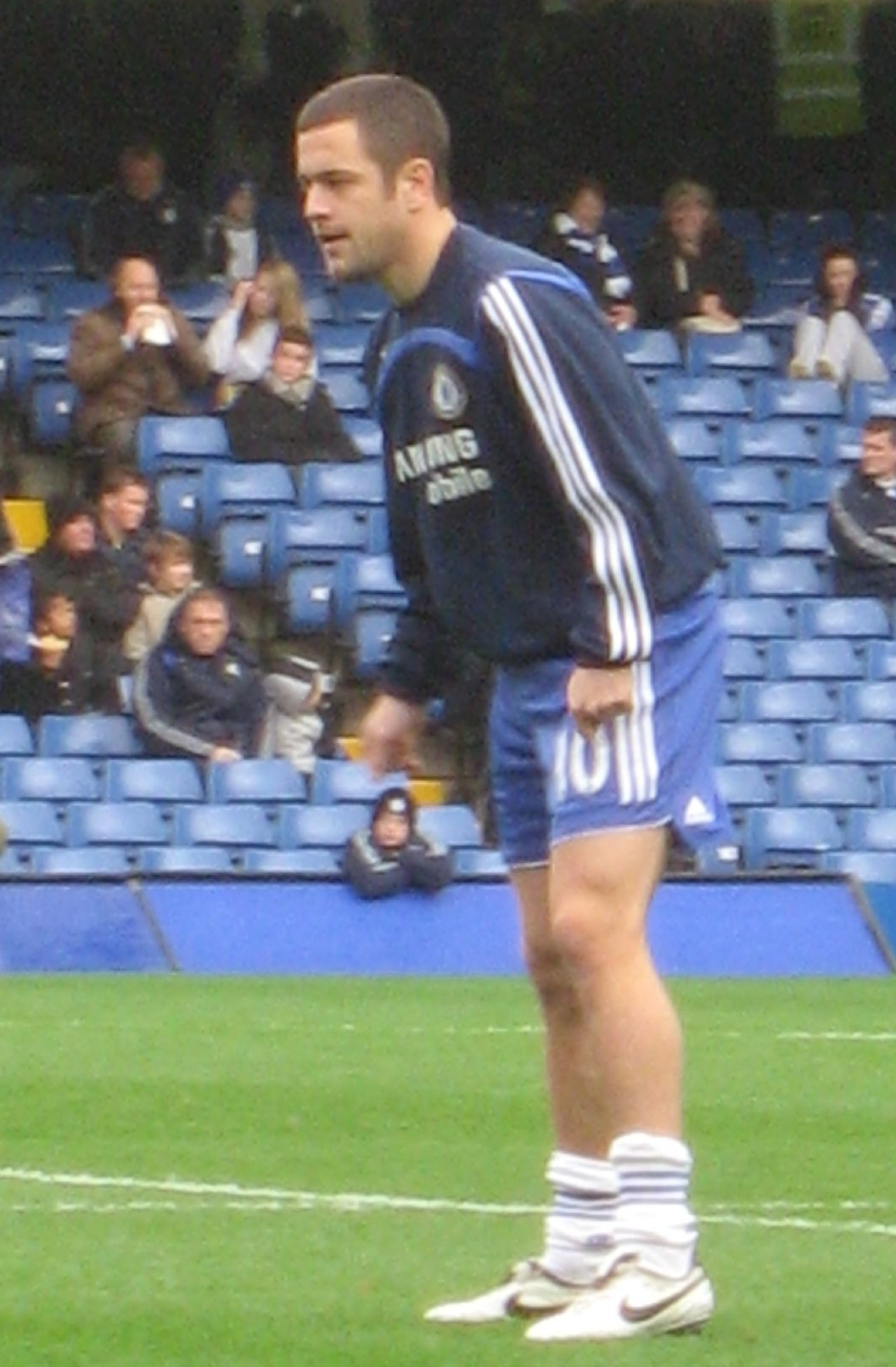
Cole warming up before a match in December 2007

On 6 August 2003, Cole signed for Chelsea for a fee of £6.6 million after he had rejected a new contract with West Ham. He was the sixth player signed after the club's takeover by billionaire Roman Abramovich, amongst those was his former West Ham teammate Glen Johnson. Manager Claudio Ranieri saw Cole as the perfect replacement for Gianfranco Zola, whom the club had released earlier that year, and West Ham declared that the transfer was enough for them not to sell any more players that summer.

==== 2003–04 season ====
A week after signing for the club, Cole made his debut in a UEFA Champions League qualifier away to MŠK Žilina. He came on as a substitute for fellow new signing Damien Duff with 21 minutes remaining and caused Michal Drahno to score an own goal to conclude a 2–0 victory. On 17 August, he played his first Premier League game for the club, again replacing Duff for the last 15 minutes in a 2–1 victory over Liverpool at Anfield. He scored his first goal on 29 October in the League Cup against Notts County, replacing Jesper Grønkjær in the 70th minute and netting the last goal in a 4–2 victory which put Chelsea into the last 16. On 17 December, in the next round, he started away to Aston Villa, finishing Hernán Crespo's cross to equalise in an eventual 1–2 defeat. Cole's only other goal of the season was his only one in the league campaign, ending a one-two with Frank Lampard to open the scoring after five minutes away to Newcastle United, albeit in a 1–2 defeat.

==== 2004–05 season ====
Cole took advantage of injuries to wingers Duff and Arjen Robben to become a regular member of Chelsea's Premier League title winning team in 2004–05. He started in the League Cup Final at the Millennium Stadium on 27 February, making way for Johnson after 81 minutes of an eventual 3–2 win after extra time against Liverpool. His form saw him hit a run of goals towards the end of the season, and he scored a goal on 9 March against Norwich City blasted in from 20 yards off his weaker left foot Cole scored ten goals for Chelsea in 2004–05 and ended the season with a Premier League champions' medal.

==== 2005–06 season ====
In the first half of the 2005–06 season, Cole secured himself in the Chelsea first-team lineup, ahead of Shaun Wright-Phillips and Damien Duff. Cole also extended his contract with Chelsea for another four seasons. He ended his season by scoring one of the goals in Chelsea's 3–0 win over Manchester United, which earned the Premier League title for the team. He was subsequently named in the PFA Team of the Year.

==== 2006–07 season ====
In January 2007, Cole underwent surgery for a stress fracture on his foot he suffered in late 2006. He made his return for Chelsea in the first leg of Chelsea's 1–1 draw in the Champions League quarter-final tie against Valencia. He started for Chelsea in their victory over Manchester United in the 2007 FA Cup Final, and went on to be substituted at half-time.

==== 2007–08 season ====
In 2007–08, Cole scored a low driven shot that tucked into the corner against West Ham, opting not to celebrate against his former club. He scored another goal in the League Cup semi-finals against Everton which sent Chelsea to another final. Cole played in the 2008 UEFA Champions League Final, which Chelsea lost on penalties to Manchester United; he was substituted in extra time for Nicolas Anelka, who missed Chelsea's crucial penalty.

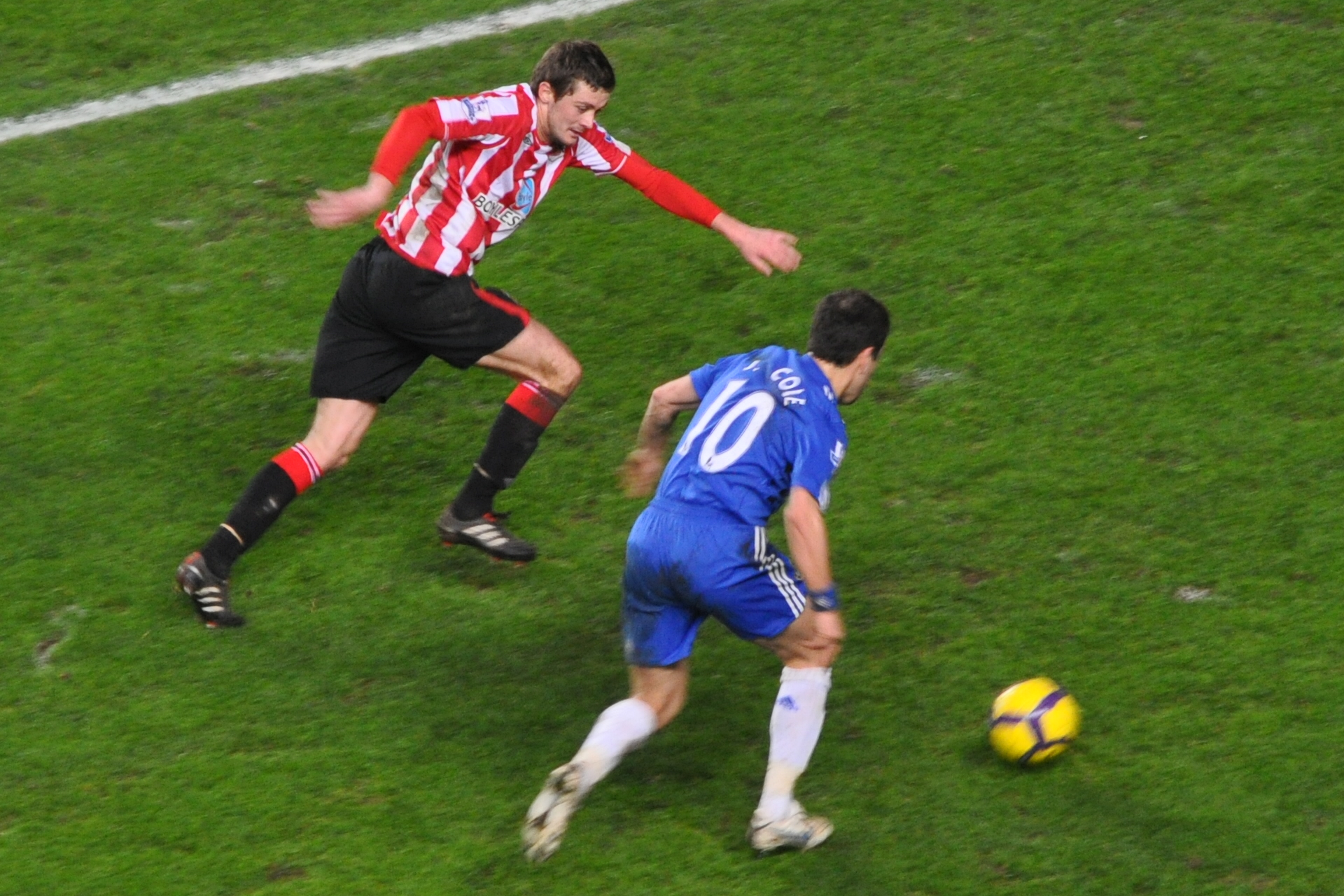
Cole, playing for Chelsea, taking on Sunderland player George McCartney

Joe Cole continued his excellent performances racking up a rate of ten goals and eight assists in all competitions, due to his performance he won the Chelsea Player of the Year 2008.

==== 2008–09 season ====
On 17 August 2008, Cole scored the first Premier League goal of the management of Luiz Felipe Scolari in a 4–0 win against Portsmouth. After surgery on his knee to repair an injury he picked up in the FA Cup clash with Southend United, Cole missed the rest of the season.

==== 2009–10 season ====
Cole did not play for Chelsea in the 2009–10 pre-season due to a cruciate ligament damage in his knee, suffered in January 2009. He made a return to the starting line-up in Chelsea's League Cup match against Queens Park Rangers on 23 September 2009 in which he was also handed the captain's armband. Cole made his first 2009–10 Premier League appearance for Chelsea against Blackburn Rovers, playing in attacking midfield in a 5–0 win.

On 8 November 2009, he played his 250th game for Chelsea, coming on as a substitute against Manchester United in the 62nd minute for Deco, on his 28th birthday. On 3 April 2010, Cole scored the first goal in a 2–1 win at Old Trafford against Manchester United in a potential title deciding game. Described as a "clever flick", his goal helped Chelsea win and overtake Manchester United at the top of the league as they were at the end of the season. He came on as a substitute as Chelsea won the 2010 FA Cup Final, his second appearance in an FA Cup Final for Chelsea. His contract with Chelsea expired on 30 June 2010, making him a free agent. Cole ended his career at Chelsea having won three Premier League titles, two FA Cups and a League Cup.

=== Liverpool ===
==== 2010–11 season ====
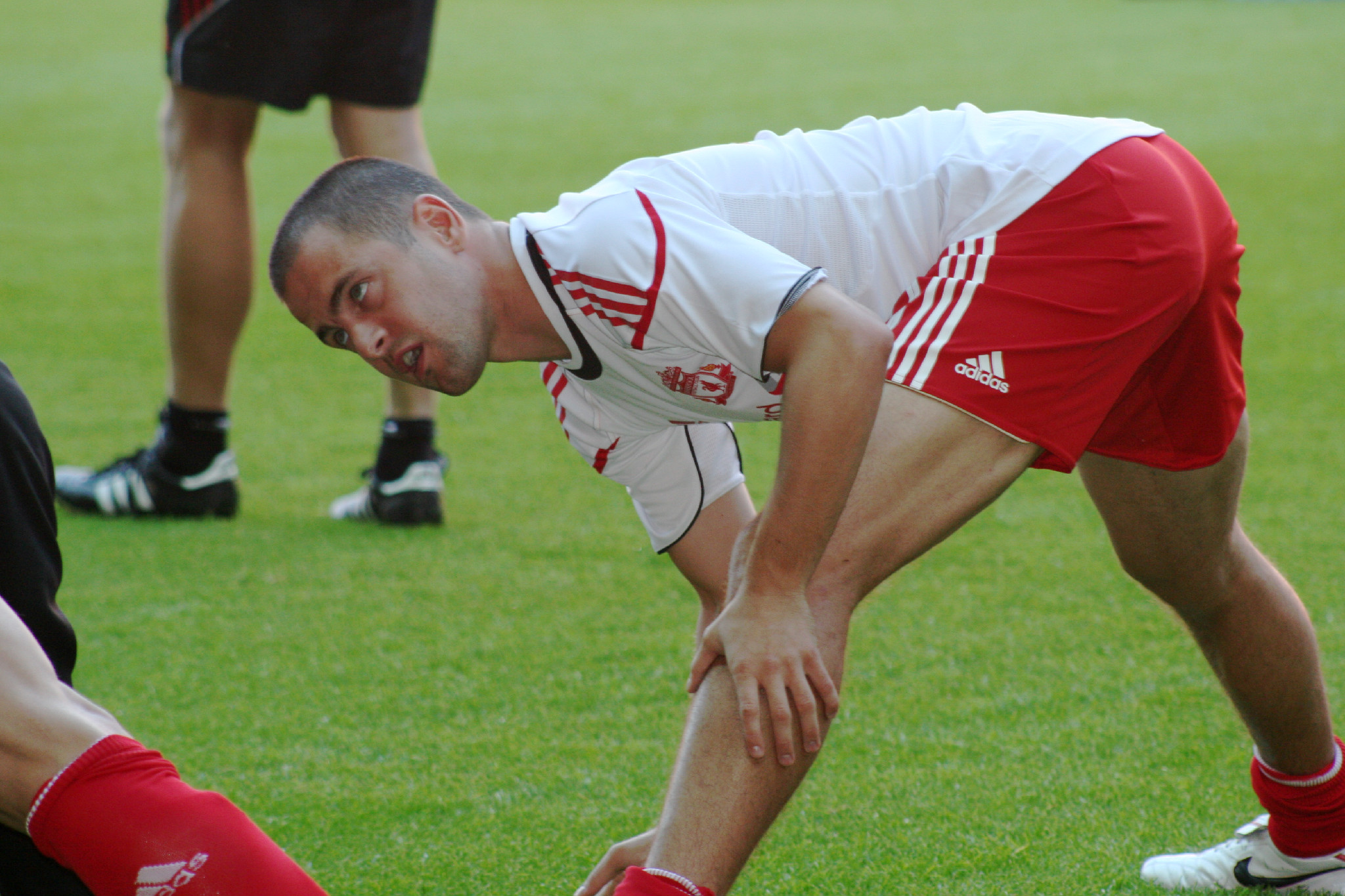
Cole warming up for Liverpool

Cole joined Liverpool on a free transfer after signing a four-year deal in July 2010. He was manager Roy Hodgson's first signing at the club and was given the number 10 shirt. Cole was to receive £90,000-a-week wages and was advertised as a major coup by the club. Club captain Steven Gerrard even claimed Cole was as technically good as Lionel Messi. After leaving the club in 2013, Cole said that joining Liverpool was a mistake due to not feeling a connection with the club or fans.

Cole made his Liverpool debut on 5 August 2010 against Rabotnički in the UEFA Europa League assisting the opening goal for David Ngog in a 2–0 win. His league debut, against Arsenal at Anfield on 15 August 2010, lasted just 45 minutes as he was sent off for a challenge on Laurent Koscielny. In his next match, on 19 August 2010, Cole missed a penalty against Trabzonspor in the UEFA Europa League third qualifying round first leg, though Liverpool still won 1–0. Cole played in Jamie Carragher's testimonial match, where he scored his first goal for the club. He then scored his first competitive goal for the club against Steaua București in a Europa League group stage match at Anfield on 16 September 2010, converting just 27 seconds into the game. Liverpool ended up winning 4–1. He scored his first Premier League goal for Liverpool in a 2–1 win against Bolton Wanderers on 1 January 2011. On 17 February, Cole played his first match under new manager Kenny Dalglish in a 0–0 draw against Sparta Prague in the Europa League, in which he came on as a first-half substitute for the injured Fábio Aurélio. Cole scored his first and only goal under Kenny Dalglish's tenure in a 5–0 win against Birmingham City at Anfield in April.

==== Loan at Lille ====
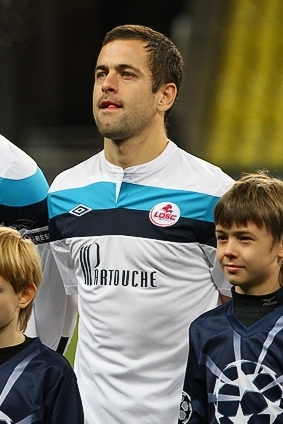
Cole with Lille in 2011

On 31 August 2011, Cole signed for French champions Lille on a season-long loan. On his debut against Saint-Étienne, he gained his first assist after a solo run where he took on and beat four players to set up the third goal in Lille's 3–1 victory. Cole got another assist in his second Lille appearance against Bordeaux, assisting an Eden Hazard goal in a 1–1 draw. On 24 September, he scored his first goal for Lille, against Lorient, in a 1–1 draw. On 23 October, Cole came on as a 60th-minute substitute for Idrissa Gueye and scored his second goal for Lille in the 3–1 win over Lyon. Following his successful substitute appearance, he was included in the starting line-up for Lille's Round of 16 Coupe de la Ligue match against Ligue 2 club Sedan on 26 October. In the match, Cole scored the team's second goal in the 40th minute, which turned out to be decisive in a 3–1 win. Cole closed out the first half of the Ligue 1 season by scoring a goal in Lille's 4–4 draw with Nice on 21 December.

Cole netted his first hat-trick for Lille in a 6–0 victory over amateur club Chantilly in the Coupe de France Round of 64 on 7 January 2012.

Cole scored his fourth league goal of the season in a 4–1 triumph over Ajaccio on 15 April, firing the ball just inside the post following a cross from Nolan Roux. The final appearance in his loan with Lille came in their 4–1 final day victory over Nancy, he provided an assist for one of Eden Hazard's three goals and was later substituted off in the 64th minute by Nolan Roux. The playmaker underwent a career renaissance during his loan spell with Lille, scoring on four occasions in 27 league appearances and providing three assists. Following the season, Lille manager Rudi Garcia declared his desire to keep Cole at the club. On 5 June 2012, however, he confirmed that Cole would not remain at Lille after stating that new Liverpool manager Brendan Rodgers wanted the player to rejoin the Liverpool squad.

==== Return to Liverpool ====
After a one-year loan to Lille, Cole returned to Liverpool with new manager Brendan Rodgers saying he wanted to have him in the squad for the upcoming season. He played three pre-season matches, against Toronto FC, Roma, and Tottenham Hotspur. On 2 August 2012, Cole started his first Liverpool game for over a year, playing in the Europa League first leg qualifier victory over FC Gomel. He was substituted after just 23 minutes being replaced by Raheem Sterling after tweaking his hamstrings. On 18 August 2012, he was able to return as a substitute in Liverpool's 3–0 defeat to West Bromwich Albion.

On 22 November 2012, Cole was given a start against BSC Young Boys in the Europa League, providing a cross to Jonjo Shelvey to score the opener and then scoring Liverpool's second, in the 2–2 draw. On 9 December 2012, he scored the equaliser as Liverpool beat his former club West Ham 3–2.

=== Return to West Ham ===
In January 2013, West Ham signed Cole on a free transfer from Liverpool, with Cole returning to his first professional club on an 18-month deal. He made his second "debut" on 5 January in an FA Cup third round tie against Manchester United. The game finished 2–2 with Cole providing the assists for both of West Ham's goals which were scored by James Collins. Cole scored his first league goal on his return to West Ham in a 1–1 home draw with Queens Park Rangers on 19 January 2013, scoring from close range after Carlton Cole's shot had been saved by QPR goalkeeper Júlio César. Cole scored his second West Ham goal since his return on 25 February 2013 in a 2–3 defeat to Tottenham, putting the Hammers 2–1 up by turning with the ball to score. On 17 August 2013, Cole scored West Ham's first Premier League goal of the 2013–14 campaign, netting the first in a 2–0 home victory over newly promoted Cardiff City.

Cole was ruled out of action for six weeks with a hamstring injury in September 2013. On 30 November 2013, he scored his second goal of the season in a home victory over Fulham, coming off the bench to complete the 3–0 victory. At the end of the 2013–14 season, and the end of Cole's 18-month contract, his departure from West Ham was confirmed. In his second spell, he had played in 37 games in all competitions, scoring five goals.

=== Aston Villa ===
In June 2014, Cole signed a two-year contract with Aston Villa on a free transfer after he was released by West Ham. His debut for the club came on 27 August, starting and being replaced by Andreas Weimann in the 62nd minute as they lost 0–1 to League One club Leyton Orient in the second round of the League Cup.

Cole's first Premier League game was on 18 October, coming on for the final nine minutes in place of Christian Benteke in a 0–3 defeat away to Everton. On 29 November, Cole made his first start for Villa away to Burnley, opening the scoring in a 1–1 draw. He was an unused substitute on 30 May 2015 in the FA Cup Final, which Villa lost 0–4 to Arsenal.

=== Coventry City ===
On 16 October 2015, Cole signed for Coventry City on a 35-day, emergency loan deal, and made his debut four days later, playing for just under an hour in an away 0–0 draw against Rochdale. His debut goal came on 3 November in a 4–3 home win against Barnsley, a 20 yards (18 m) free-kick which put Coventry 4-2 up. In November, his loan with Coventry was extended until 3 January 2016.

On 7 January 2016, Cole signed on a free transfer on a deal lasting until the end of the season. In all, Cole made 22 league appearances for the Sky Blues, scoring twice, both from long-range free kicks.

=== Tampa Bay Rowdies and retirement ===
On 4 May 2016, Cole signed with the Tampa Bay Rowdies in the North American Soccer League (NASL), signing a contract through the end of the 2017 NASL season, with a club option for 2018. He made his debut ten days later, playing the full 90 minutes of a 1–1 home draw against Rayo OKC. Two weeks later, away to Minnesota United, he scored his first goal to open a 2–0 win, assisting Eric Avila for the other; he was voted the league's Player of the Week. On 19 October, Cole was one of ten players nominated for the NASL Golden Ball award. In June 2018, Cole was promoted to assistant coach with the Rowdies, while still acting as a player as well.

Cole retired from football on 13 November 2018. He took up a coaching role at Chelsea.

=== Belstone ===
On 21 April 2021, Cole briefly came out of retirement to play for Hertfordshire Senior County League Premier Division club Belstone, who are managed by his friend Aaron Lincoln. Cole played the first half of a Premier Division Cup tie away to Harefield United Reserves. Belstone won the fixture 2–1. He continues to occasionally train with the club, and has since made two further appearances for Belstone in pre-season friendlies.

== International career ==
As a youngster, Cole played for the England's under-17 team, where he scored the winning goal against Norway in a final of the Nordic Tournament. Cole made his senior international debut against Mexico in May 2001. He was a member of England's 2002 World Cup squad, making one substitute appearance in the tournament. Cole was also a squad member at UEFA Euro 2004, but did not play.

Cole's displays in England's friendlies leading up to the 2006 World Cup enhanced his reputation ahead of the summer's finals in Germany. In May 2006, he was confirmed in the England squad for the World Cup, ahead of Chelsea teammate Shaun Wright-Phillips. He played on the left side of midfield in England's opening game against Paraguay on 10 June 2006. On 20 June 2006, England drew with Sweden in Group B play, with a final score of 2–2. Cole scored one of the goals of the tournament, a volley in the 34th minute of the match and got an assist in the 85th when he sent in a ball to Steven Gerrard, with this contribution earning him the Man of the match award.

Cole lined up for the England squad for the first time since the 2006 World Cup in the 1–1 friendly draw against the Netherlands, on 15 November 2006 providing an assist for Wayne Rooney from a cross. After another injury, he returned to start the friendly against Brazil at Wembley Stadium on 1 June 2007.

Cole scored his seventh goal for England in June 2007, in Euro 2008 qualifying, away to Estonia.

On 7 February 2008, Cole was one of the 23-man squad selected for the friendly against Switzerland which they won 2–1, courtesy of Jermaine Jenas and Shaun Wright-Phillips goals. For Jenas' goal, Cole skipped down the left and crossed to Jenas. Cole was named Man of the match for his performance.

In August 2008, Cole scored a late equalising goal in a 2–2 draw at Wembley against the Czech Republic after coming on as a substitute. He then scored England's two goals in the next fixture after coming on as a second-half substitute in the 2–0 defeat of Andorra in the opening match for 2010 World Cup qualifying. In England's next World Cup qualifier, against Croatia, he suffered a head injury in a clash with Croatian defender Robert Kovač which resulted in the Croat's sending off.

Cole was named in the final 23-man selection for England's 2010 World Cup squad. He played, and scored, in a 3–0 victory against Platinum Stars, of South Africa's Premier Soccer League, in an unofficial warm-up game. However, he was limited to only two substitute appearances in the tournament itself, as England lost to Germany in the second round in what was to be his final international appearance.

== Style of play ==
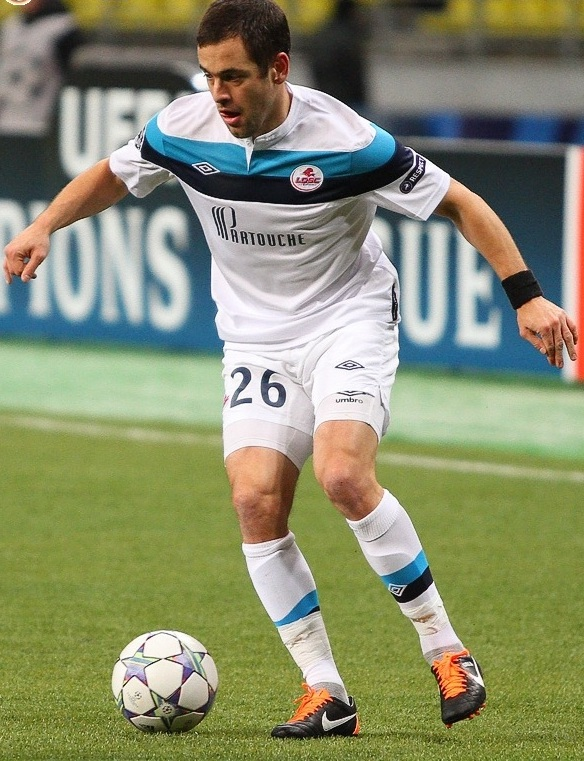
Cole playing for Lille in 2011.

A clever, versatile, and technically gifted midfielder, Cole was capable of playing in several offensive midfield positions, as an attacking midfielder, winger or supporting striker. A quick, strong and creative player, Cole was known in particular for his dribbling skills, and was capable of both scoring and creating goals due to his vision, passing and striking ability. His dribbling and overall flair was praised by Pelé, who stated that, "He has the skills of a Brazilian," during Cole's spell at Chelsea. Despite his talent, some pundits have argued that he failed to live up to the potential he demonstrated in his youth, partially due to the recurring injuries he sustained throughout his career.

== Media ==
In 2001, aged 19, he was the subject of the BBC documentary Football's Dream Factory presented by Alan Hansen.

He has been a pundit on TNT Sports since 2023.

== Personal life ==
Cole married fitness instructor Carly Zucker in June 2009. Cole had been dating Zucker since 2002 and proposed to her in 2007. The couple have a daughter, Ruby Tatiana Cole, born in March 2010, and a son, Harrison "Harry" Cole, born in October 2012.

In November 2009, Cole was caught driving his Audi A4 at 105 mph on a 70 mph section of dual carriageway in Claygate, Surrey. Subsequently Cole received a suspended driving ban, and was fined £750 and ordered to pay £600 costs.

Cole is a wearer of contact lenses. He has worn them since his early days at Chelsea.

== Career statistics ==
=== Club ===
Appearances and goals by club, season and competition
Club	Season	League			National Cup		League Cup		Europe		Other		Total	
Club	Season	Division	Apps	Goals	Apps	Goals	Apps	Goals	Apps	Goals	Apps	Goals	Apps	Goals
West Ham United	1998–99	Premier League	8	0	1	0	0	0	—		—		9	0
West Ham United	1999–2000	Premier League	22	1	1	0	4	1	5 (Note: Appearances in UEFA Intertoto Cup) (Note: Appearances in UEFA Cup)	0	—		32	2
West Ham United	2000–01	Premier League	30	5	4	0	2	0	—		—		36	5
West Ham United	2001–02	Premier League	30	0	3	1	0	0	—		—		33	1
West Ham United	2002–03	Premier League	36	4	2	1	2	0	—		—		40	5
West Ham United	Total		126	10	11	2	8	1	5	0	—		150	13
Chelsea	2003–04	Premier League	35	1	3	0	3	2	9 (Note: Appearances in UEFA Champions League)	0	—		50	3
Chelsea	2004–05	Premier League	28	8	3	0	6	0	9	1	—		46	9
Chelsea	2005–06	Premier League	34	7	6	2	1	0	6	1	1 (Note: Appearances in FA Community Shield)	0	48	10
Chelsea	2006–07	Premier League	13	0	2	0	2	1	7	1	0	0	24	2
Chelsea	2007–08	Premier League	33	7	3	0	5	1	13	2	1	0	55	10
Chelsea	2008–09	Premier League	14	2	2	0	0	0	4	1	—		20	3
Chelsea	2009–10	Premier League	26	2	5	0	3	0	5	0	—		39	2
Chelsea	Total		183	27	24	2	20	4	53	6	2	0	282	39
Liverpool	2010–11	Premier League	20	2	0	0	0	0	12 (Note: Appearances in UEFA Europa League)	1	—		32	3
Liverpool	2012–13	Premier League	6	1	0	0	1	0	3	1	—		10	2
Liverpool	Total		26	3	0	0	1	0	15	2	—		42	5
Lille (loan)	2011–12	Ligue 1	32	4	3	3	2	2	6	0	—		43	9
West Ham United	2012–13	Premier League	11	2	1	0	0	0	—		—		12	2
West Ham United	2013–14	Premier League	20	3	0	0	5	0	—		—		25	3
West Ham United	Total		31	5	1	0	5	0	—		—		37	5
Aston Villa	2014–15	Premier League	12	1	2	0	1	0	—		—		15	1
Aston Villa	2015–16	Premier League	0	0	0	0	1	0	—		—		1	0
Aston Villa	Total		12	1	2	0	2	0	—		—		16	1
Coventry City (loan)	2015–16	League One	7	1	0	0	0	0	—		—		7	1
Coventry City	2015–16	League One	15	1	0	0	0	0	—		—		15	1
Coventry City	Total		22	2	0	0	0	0	—		—		22	2
Tampa Bay Rowdies	2016	NASL	24	9	2	0	—		—		—		26	9
Tampa Bay Rowdies	2017	USL	28	7	1	0	—		—		—		29	7
Tampa Bay Rowdies	2018	USL	30	4	1	0	—		—		—		31	4
Tampa Bay Rowdies	Total		82	20	4	0	—		—		—		86	20
Belstone	2020–21	Hertfordshire Senior County League Premier Division	0	0	0	0	—		—		1 (Note: Appearance in Hertfordshire Senior County League Premier Division Cup)	0	1	0
Career total			514	72	45	7	38	7	79	8	3	0	679	94

=== International ===
Appearances and goals by national team and year
National team	Year	Apps	Goals
England	2001	1	0
England	2002	7	0
England	2003	5	2
England	2004	6	0
England	2005	10	2
England	2006	9	2
England	2007	9	1
England	2008	6	3
England	2009	0	0
England	2010	3	0
Total		56	10

Scores and results list England's goal tally first, score column indicates score after each Cole goal.

List of international goals scored by Joe Cole
No.	Date	Venue	Cap	Opponent	Score	Result	Competition
1	3 June 2003	Leicester, England	10	Serbia and Montenegro	2–1	2–1	Friendly
2	16 November 2003	Manchester, England	13	Denmark	2–1	2–3	Friendly
3	26 March 2005	Manchester, England	20	Northern Ireland	1–0	4–0	2006 FIFA World Cup qualification
4	3 September 2005	Cardiff, Wales	25	Wales	1–0	1–0	2006 FIFA World Cup qualification
5	1 March 2006	Liverpool, England	30	Uruguay	2–1	2–1	Friendly
6	20 June 2006	Cologne, Germany	35	Sweden	1–0	2–2	2006 FIFA World Cup
7	6 June 2007	Tallinn, Estonia	40	Estonia	1–0	3–0	UEFA Euro 2008 qualification
8	20 August 2008	London, England	51	Czech Republic	2–2	2–2	Friendly
9	6 September 2008	Barcelona, Spain	52	Andorra	1–0	2–0	2010 World Cup qualification
10	6 September 2008	Barcelona, Spain	52	Andorra	2–0	2–0	2010 World Cup qualification

== Honours ==
West Ham United

- UEFA Intertoto Cup: 1999

Chelsea

- Premier League: 2004–05, 2005–06, 2009–10
- FA Cup: 2006–07, 2009–10
- Football League Cup: 2004–05; runner-up: 2007–08
- FA Community Shield: 2005
- UEFA Champions League runner-up: 2007–08

Aston Villa

- FA Cup runner-up: 2014–15

Individual

- West Ham United Hammer of the Year: 2002–03
- Premier League Player of the Month: March 2005
- Ballon d'Or: Nominated: 2006
- PFA Team of the Year: 2005–06 Premier League
- Chelsea Player of the Year: 2008
- NASL Best XI: 2016
