= David James (footballer, born 1970) =

English footballer and pundit (born 1970)

David James MBE
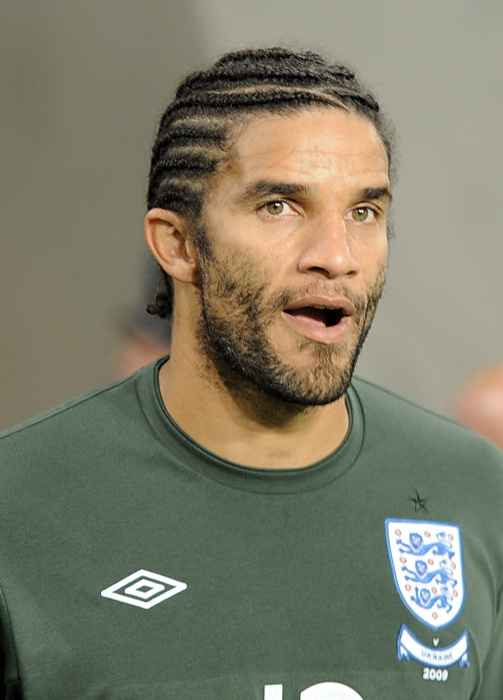
- James with England in 2009

Personal information
- Full name: David Benjamin James
- Date of birth: 1 August 1970 (age 56)
- Place of birth: Welwyn Garden City, England
- Height: 1.94 m (6 ft 4 in)
- Position: Goalkeeper

Youth career
- 1986–1988: Watford

Senior career*
Years	Team	Apps	(Gls)
1988–1992	Watford	89	(0)
1992–1999	Liverpool	214	(0)
1999–2001	Aston Villa	67	(0)
2001–2004	West Ham United	91	(0)
2004–2006	Manchester City	93	(0)
2006–2010	Portsmouth	134	(0)
2010–2012	Bristol City	81	(0)
2012–2013	AFC Bournemouth	19	(0)
2013	ÍBV	17	(0)
2014	Kerala Blasters	12	(0)
Total		817	(0)

International career
1990–1992	England U21	10	(0)
1997–2010	England	53	(0)

Managerial career
- 2013: ÍBV (assistant)
- 2013–2014: Luton Town (assistant)
- 2014: Kerala Blasters
- 2018: Kerala Blasters
- 2020: Þróttur Vogum (assistant)
- * Club domestic league appearances and goals

David Benjamin James (born 1 August 1970) is an English professional football manager and former player. A former goalkeeper, he is one of a select number of players who have amassed over 1,000 career appearances.

James is fifth on the list of all-time Premier League appearances, having played in 572 top-level matches, and held the Premier League record for most clean sheets with 169 until Petr Čech surpassed this record. He holds the record for most penalties saved in Premier League history (13).

He was capped 53 times by England between 1997 and 2010, and was first choice goalkeeper during the team's UEFA Euro 2004 and the 2010 FIFA World Cup campaigns. He was appointed a Member of the Order of the British Empire (MBE) in the 2012 Birthday Honours for services to football and charity.

Having started his career with Watford, James went on to feature in the Premier League for Liverpool, Aston Villa, West Ham United, Manchester City and Portsmouth. He gained a Football League Cup winner's medal with Liverpool in 1995, an FA Cup winner's medal with Portsmouth in 2008, as well as runners-up medals with Aston Villa in 2000, Liverpool in 1996 and Portsmouth in 2010. In 2010, at the age of 39, he became the oldest goalkeeper to appear in an FA Cup Final. James dropped down a division in 2010 to play for Bristol City and later played for League One side AFC Bournemouth. He joined Icelandic side ÍBV Vestmannaeyjar in 2013 in a joint playing and coaching capacity, before officially retiring.

In October 2013, James took up a coaching position at Luton Town, the club he has supported since his childhood. The following year, he became the marquee player and manager of the newly formed Kerala Blasters. He returned to the club in 2018, being dismissed in December following an 11-match winless run.

== Club career ==
=== Watford ===
Born in Welwyn Garden City, Hertfordshire, James grew up supporting Luton Town. He signed as a trainee with Luton's local rivals Watford upon leaving school, and was first selected for the club's senior team in 1989. In his days as a youth player, he helped Watford win the FA Youth Cup. Following the departure of Tony Coton, James made his league debut on 25 August 1990 in a 1–2 defeat against Millwall, and his performance resulted in an England U21 call-up for a match against the Republic of Ireland. He earned a total of ten caps for the U21s.

At club level, James made 89 first-team appearances for Watford, and was named the club's Player of the Season for the 1990–91 season, when he kept goal in all 46 Second Division games as Watford escaped relegation. In 2008, James was inducted into the Watford Hall of Fame for his services to the club.

=== Liverpool ===
James was signed for £1.25 million by Liverpool on 6 July 1992. He made his Liverpool debut on 16 August in a 0–1 league defeat to Nottingham Forest. After conceding twenty goals in eleven matches in the first half of the 1993–94, he was dropped in favour of veteran Bruce Grobbelaar, but was recalled to the starting line-up and kept his first clean sheet of the season in a 1–0 away win over Arsenal on 31 January 1993, which included a penalty save from Paul Merson. He also received a runners-up medal in 1996 in the FA Cup while being on the losing side against Manchester United.

James rose to fame together with Liverpool teammates Steve McManaman, Jamie Redknapp, and Robbie Fowler, who were nicknamed the "Spice Boys" – an epithet named after the Spice Girls that was used by those who alleged the Liverpool team of the 1990s were more focused on partying than winning games. James' frequent blunders earned him the nickname Calamity James. He put down his spate of errors to an overindulgence in playing computer games that in turn affected his concentration. Despite winning the 1995 Football League Cup, James' hold on the starting position was put in jeopardy with the acquisition of Brad Friedel. He made 277 appearances for Liverpool in total.

=== Aston Villa ===
On 23 June 1999, James was sold to Aston Villa for £1.8 million. He made his Villa debut on 7 August, and kept a clean sheet in a 1–0 away win over Newcastle United in the opening Premier League game. He was decisive in a penalty shoot-out against Bolton Wanderers in the 2000 FA Cup semi-final, but conceded Chelsea's winning goal in the ensuing final, the last to be staged at the old Wembley. Over two years, he made 85 appearances for Villa.

=== West Ham United ===
James moved to West Ham United for £3.5 million on 11 July 2001, signing a four-year contract. However, a serious knee injury sustained while on international duty kept him out for several months.

James made his debut for West Ham on 24 November 2001 in a 1–0 home loss to Tottenham Hotspur. In 2002–03, West Ham were relegated to the First Division. James stayed with West Ham at the start of the 2003–04 season. He played 102 total games in all competitions for West Ham.

=== Manchester City ===
"It was, to put it mildly, the most eccentric of finales. There were still two minutes of normal time remaining, plus five for stoppages, when [manager] Stuart Pearce, adopting a form of leadership that would have been wacky even by Brian Clough's standards, had the brainwave of replacing a midfielder, Claudio Reyna, with his reserve goalkeeper, Nicky Weaver, and ordering David James to play as a centre-forward. Amazingly the disorder almost paid off. With James charging around like a headless ostrich, his cameo role incorporating a hilarious air-shot and at least two horrendously late but probably well-meant chops at Doriva's legs, the hitherto wretched referee Rob Styles decreed that Joey Barton's centre had flicked off Franck Queudrue's hand for a penalty."

— Football journalist Daniel Taylor, describing David James brief 6-minute cameo as a striker against Middlesbrough in the post-match report

James returned to the Premier League by signing for Manchester City on 14 January 2004 for £2 million fee as a replacement for the retired David Seaman, on Seaman's recommendation. He reunited with his former Liverpool "Spice Boys" teammates Robbie Fowler and Steve McManaman.

James made his debut on 17 January 2004 in a 1–1 home draw with Blackburn Rovers. City won only four of the seventeen matches that James started, two of which came after James saved penalties against Wolverhampton Wanderers and Leicester City. James said that exploring the field of sport psychology improved his skills as a goalkeeper, particularly saving penalty kicks.

On the last day of the 2004–05 season, James was playing for City who needed to beat Middlesbrough to qualify for the UEFA Cup at the opposition's expense. With five minutes remaining the score was 1–1, when City's manager Stuart Pearce replaced midfielder Claudio Reyna with the substitute goalkeeper Nicky Weaver, and James was moved to play in attack for the remainder of the game. The unusual tactic almost worked when, in injury time, Middlesbrough defender Franck Queudrue conceded a penalty by handling a cross that was aimed at James. However, Fowler's penalty was saved by Middlesbrough goalkeeper Mark Schwarzer, meaning they qualified for the UEFA Cup at City's expense.

=== Portsmouth ===
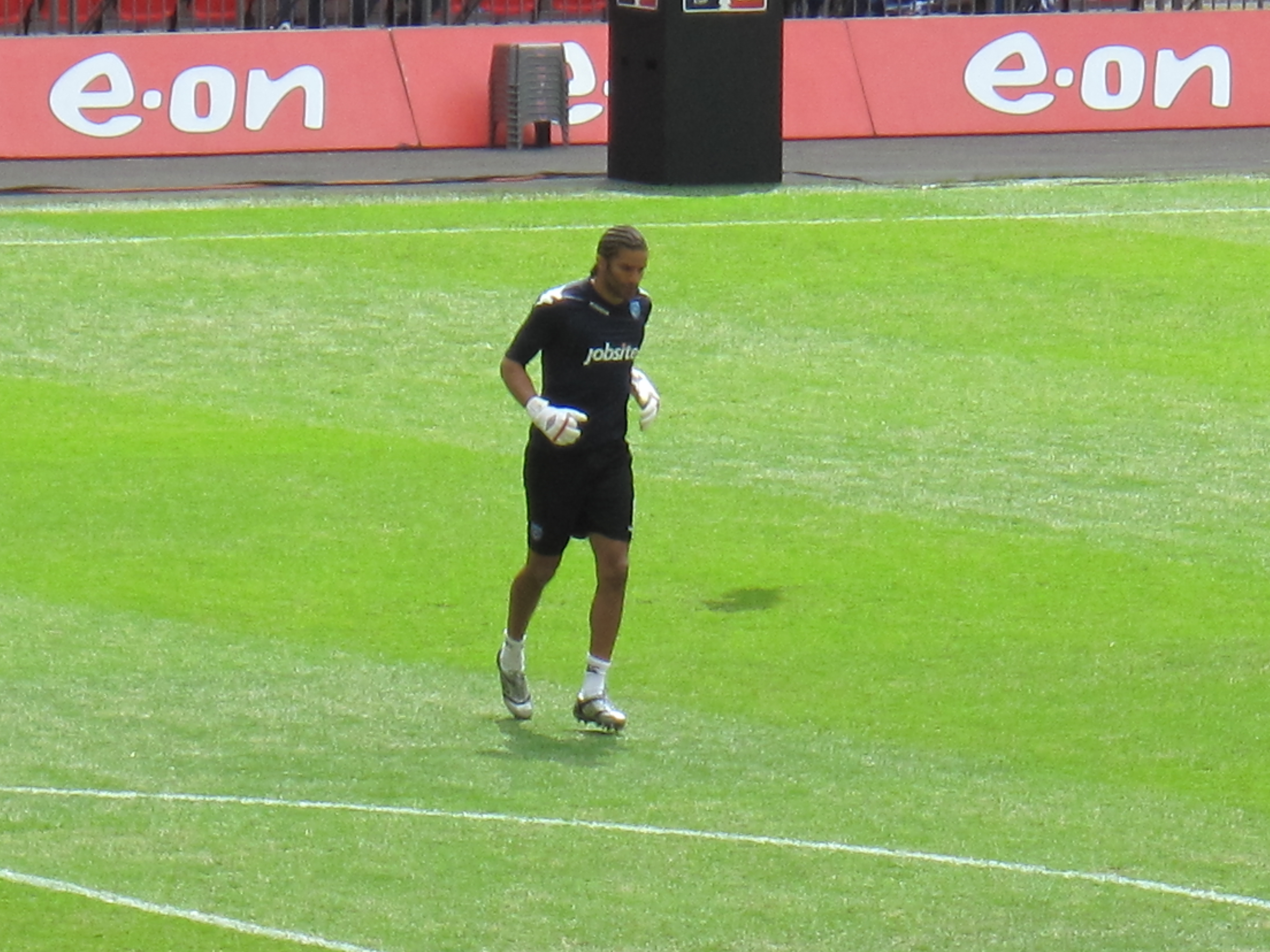
James during his time at Portsmouth

On 10 August 2006, James, who had separated from his wife, stated that he needed to leave Manchester City to be closer to his children, who lived in London. Manchester City confirmed they had accepted a bid from Portsmouth. Two days later, he joined Portsmouth for £1.2 million, signing a two-year deal.

James kept clean sheets in his first five appearances for Portsmouth. On 22 April 2007, James kept his 142nd Premier League clean sheet in a goalless draw with Aston Villa, breaking the record of 141 previously held by David Seaman. At the end of 2006–07, James was named Portsmouth's player of the season.

James has made the most league appearances of any goalkeeper since the formation of the Premier League over fifteen seasons, in addition to conceding the most goals. On 30 January 2008, in a league match against Manchester United, he became the third player (after Gary Speed and Ryan Giggs) to cross the 500-match threshold.

James signed a one-year contract extension in May 2007, which kept him at Fratton Park until the end of the 2008–09 season. James won the second major trophy of his career during that season, as Portsmouth claimed a 1–0 victory over Cardiff City at Wembley Stadium in the 2008 FA Cup Final. James was named as the goalkeeper in the PFA Team of the Year for 2007–08; only he and Aston Villa's Ashley Young were from teams outside the top four. On 8 November 2008, he made his 100th appearance for Portsmouth.

He holds the distinction of twice having been the record holder for consecutive Premier League appearances, with 159 during his Liverpool days from February 1994 to February 1998, and 166 between Manchester City and Portsmouth from 2006 to 2008; both streaks were eventually topped by Chelsea's Frank Lampard and Tottenham Hotspur's Brad Friedel, respectively.

On 14 February 2009 against Manchester City, James made his 536th Premier League appearance, breaking Speed's all-time record.

On 22 April 2009, Times Online named James as the 15th greatest player in Portsmouth's history.

James captained Portsmouth in the FA Cup semi-final against Tottenham Hotspur where Portsmouth won 2–0 in extra time, describing the experience as "superb". He also captained the team in the final as Portsmouth were beaten 1–0 by double winners Chelsea.

His contract expired at the end of the 2009–10 season, and he expressed interest in succeeding Avram Grant as Portsmouth manager, though this came to nothing. The club offered him a new playing contract, but withdrew the offer after he failed to commit to the club; therefore, James left Portsmouth and became a free agent.

=== Bristol City ===
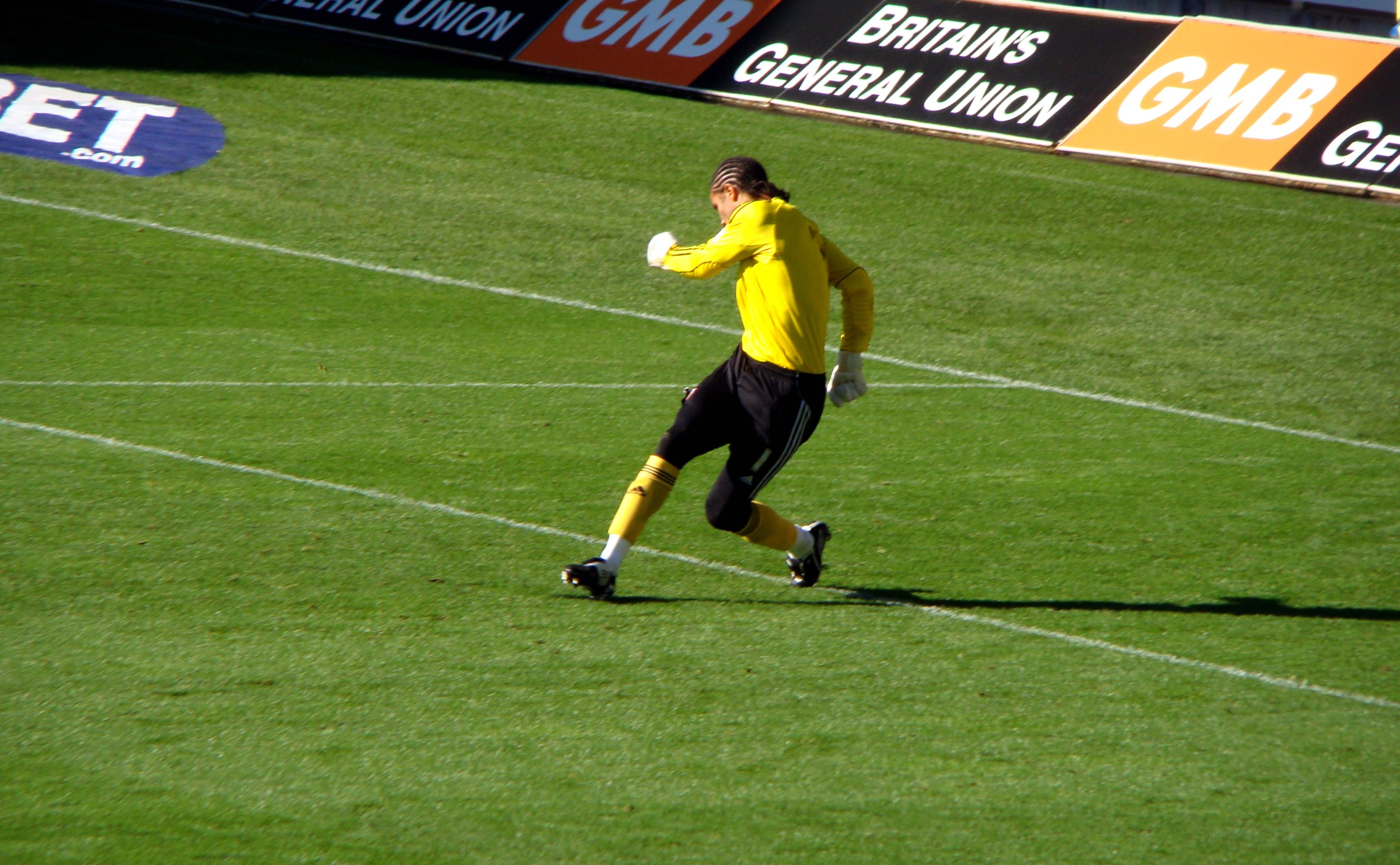
James playing for Bristol City in a Severnside derby against Cardiff City, 2010

James signed a one-year contract with Championship side Bristol City on 30 July 2010, with the option of a second year. He stated that he hoped that his performances at the club would keep him on the radar for the England team and that his decision to join them was motivated by a desire to be closer to his family home in Devon.

James' league debut for Bristol City came on 7 August 2010 in a 3–0 defeat to Millwall. On 11 February 2011, the eve of his 850th club appearance, James announced he had signed a contract extension with the club until June 2012. On 10 March 2012, James reached 900 club appearances in a game against Cardiff City in the Severnside derby, in which he was made captain as a mark of respect.

He was released by Bristol City on 1 May 2012, and in July 2012 began training with Exeter City.

=== AFC Bournemouth ===
On 27 September 2012, he arrived at Dean Court to train with AFC Bournemouth, signing a one-year deal to play for them the following day. However, he did not see out the contract, leaving the club by mutual consent in March 2013 after making 19 appearances.

=== ÍBV Vestmannaeyjar ===
On 2 April 2013, James signed a contract with Icelandic club ÍBV until the end of the 2013 season in a joint player/coach capacity. He linked up with former Portsmouth teammate Hermann Hreiðarsson, the manager of ÍBV. The ÍBV chairman stated that James was not being paid high wages, and that he was primarily playing out of kindness and to gain coaching experience. His arrival at ÍBV saw much higher attendances than in previous years. ÍBV ended the season in sixth position, and James announced his retirement from playing.

=== Kerala Blasters and retirement ===
He was signed by Kerala Blasters FC, owned by Sachin Tendulkar, for the 2014 Indian Super League as a player-manager. He said "I hope my involvement with ISL will be the start of something great." The team's first fixture on 13 October, in which James played, resulted in a 1–0 defeat at NorthEast United. His team eventually became the runners up in the inaugural ISL tournament by losing to Atletico de Kolkata 1–0 in the finals. James retired at the end of the season.

== International career ==
=== Youth career and early senior career ===
After making one England under-21 appearance whilst at Watford, James made his full debut for Glenn Hoddle's England in a friendly against Mexico on 29 March 1997 when he was a Liverpool player. He kept his first international clean sheet as England beat Mexico 2–0 with goals from Teddy Sheringham and James' Liverpool teammate Robbie Fowler. He was in the provisional 28-man squad for Euro 2000 before missing the final cut.

James is the only black goalkeeper to represent England as a full international.

=== Years of rotation and Euro 2004 ===
James was selected by Sven-Göran Eriksson for his 23-man squad for the 2002 FIFA World Cup. He was third choice behind David Seaman and Nigel Martyn, as the veteran Arsenal goalkeeper played in all five of England's games.

For several years he had to play understudy to England's regular keeper, David Seaman. When Seaman was dropped after making a mistake against Macedonia in 2002, James became the new England number one. He retained his place in the England team even after West Ham's relegation to the First Division in 2003, and was the only player from outside the top flight to win an England cap between 1999 (Michael Gray) and 2007 (David Nugent). He went on to play in all of England's matches at Euro 2004.

James was dropped from the starting XI, his place being taken by Tottenham's Paul Robinson. James came on as a half-time substitute and conceded all four goals in the 4–1 drubbing England suffered at the hands of Denmark during a friendly on 17 August 2005 – their worst defeat in 25 years. James still remained part of the England squad, and was selected as the second-choice goalkeeper behind Robinson for the 2006 World Cup in Germany, though he did not play.

Along with fellow veterans David Beckham and Sol Campbell, James was dropped from the England squad at the start of Steve McClaren's reign and was not called up during the 2006–07 season. He was recalled for the friendly with Germany on 22 August 2007, over a year since first being omitted. James played the whole of the second half of England's 2–1 defeat to Germany as a substitute for Robinson. In so doing, he became the first Portsmouth player to play for the senior England team since Mark Hateley in 1984. However, Scott Carson was chosen ahead of both James and Robinson for the decisive Euro 2008 qualifier against Croatia on 21 November 2007. England lost the match 2-3, partly due to a fumble by Carson, which gifted Croatia the game's opening goal. Following England's failure to qualify for Euro 2008 McClaren was sacked as England manager and replaced by Fabio Capello. James was subsequently critical of McClaren's treatment of England's goalkeepers.

=== 2010 World Cup cycle ===
On 7 February 2008, James was selected as goalkeeper for Capello's first match in charge, a friendly against Switzerland. It was his first start for England since a friendly with Colombia in May 2005. James firmly re-established himself as England's first choice goalkeeper, starting in each of Capello's first 13 games in charge. Persistent injury problems over the following year left James' hopes of retaining the No. 1 spot for the 2010 World Cup in doubt, with Capello stating he would only consider players who were 100% fit for his squad. After the World Cup qualifier against Ukraine on 1 April 2009, James did not start a match for England until the final friendly before the World Cup against Japan on 30 May 2010.

Prior to the tournament, James was backed to reclaim the number one shirt by former England goalkeepers Gordon Banks and David Seaman.

On 3 June 2010, it was confirmed that James would be travelling to the World Cup Finals in South Africa, and would be allocated the number 1 jersey. He was the oldest footballer in the tournament. James was not selected for the first game of the World Cup against the United States, with Robert Green instead starting in the England goal. However, Green made an error that allowed Clint Dempsey to score an equaliser that resulted in the game being drawn. James returned to the starting line-up in the next game, keeping a clean sheet against Algeria on 18 June 2010. In doing so James became the oldest ever World Cup debutant at 39 years and 321 days old. Five days later, he kept another clean sheet as England won against Slovenia 1–0 to ensure that they would reach the last 16, although they finished second in Group C behind the United States. They were eliminated in the following round after a 4–1 defeat to Germany.

== Style of play ==
Considered to be one of England's best goalkeepers in his prime, James was an aggressive and imposing goalkeeper, who was known for his excellent shot-stopping ability and ability to produce long throws, as well as his professionalism, leadership, and ability to organise his defence; however, he also came under criticism in the media for his perceived poor decision–making and distribution with his feet, although he was able to improve upon this aspect of his game as his career progressed. His ability to claim crosses was also cited as a weakness in his gameplay. His inconsistency and error–prone performances led to him being nicknamed "Calamity James" in the media. In his youth, his role model was Italian goalkeeper Dino Zoff. James was also known for his penalty-stopping abilities.

== Coaching career ==
Commenting on the comparatively low numbers of black players who become managers in English football, James said in 2012 that "I struggle with the racist issue in football because I don't see it, and that's not because I've got my head in the sand. In the earlier days, yes, but the game's changed...If you don't want to go, an [sic] moan about not getting jobs, well, probably because you haven't been on the course is the reason why you haven't got a job."

=== ÍBV ===
James served as a player-coach for manager Hermann Hreiðarsson at ÍBV in the Icelandic Úrvalsdeild karla during the 2013 season.

=== Luton Town ===
Following his stint at ÍBV, James joined Luton Town in October 2013 in a coaching capacity in order to gain experience towards a UEFA A-licence qualification.

=== Kerala Blasters ===
James was the player-manager of Kerala Blasters FC in the Indian Super League 2014 season. Utilising a distinctly British identity, signing players such as Stephen Pearson and Michael Chopra, he took them to the ISL playoffs at the first attempt, after a 4th-place finish in the league phase. In the playoffs, extra time was needed to see off Chennaiyin 4–3 on aggregate, taking James and Kerala Blasters to the 2014 Indian Super League final, only to lose 1–0 to Atlético de Kolkata. James left the club at the end of his contract.

James returned to the helm of the club as their head coach a day after the sacking of Rene Meulensteen on 3 January 2018, following a string of poor performances. He set about rebuilding the side in the January transfer window, releasing Mark Sifneos and signing Iceland international midfielder Guðjón Baldvinsson on loan from Stjarnan, along with appointing former Portsmouth teammate Hermann Hreiðarsson as his assistant. Despite overseeing a turnaround in form, he could only guide the Blasters to 6th place at the end the 2017–18 Indian Super League season, missing out on the play-offs.

The club started the 2018–19 Indian Super League season with a victory, beating ATK 2–0 at Salt Lake Stadium. However this was followed by an 11-match winless run, which resulted in James' sacking in December 2018

=== Þróttur Vogum ===
In July 2020, James served as an assistant coach to Hermann Hreiðarsson with Icelandic club Þróttur Vogum for one game.

== Personal life ==
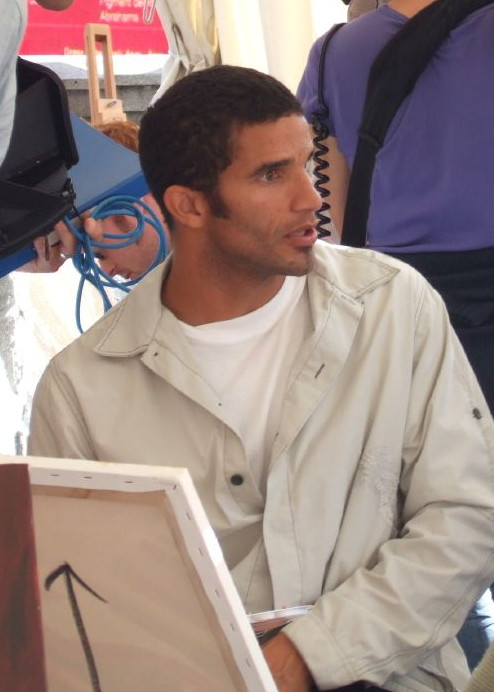
James in 2005

James was brought up in Welwyn Garden City, attending the Sir Frederic Osborn School (Now Ridgeway Academy). He is of mixed Jamaican and English descent, and spent part of his childhood in Jamaica. He has four children with his former wife Tanya, whom he divorced in 2005. He later remarried and lived in Chudleigh, Devon but has since divorced.

James has gained attention for modelling assignments, first with Giorgio Armani in 1995, and with H&M in 2005.

James was known for experimenting with his hairstyle. In May 2007, a "Who Ate All the Pies" column ridiculed him, among David Beckham and others, for "backcombed efforts", and likened a previous November 2006 cut to fictional character Clark Kent, both captured by the BBC programme Match of the Day (MOTD).

During the 2003 off-season, James was a guest at the training camp of American football team the Miami Dolphins, where he studied their training and conditioning methods.

James was a 20-a-day smoker during his early career, having taken up the habit while sidelined with injury at the age of 15 and quit for the new millennium. He fronted an anti-smoking campaign in 2008.

=== Charity work ===
In 2005, James visited the south eastern African nation of Malawi to help raise AIDS awareness. He subsequently set up the David James Foundation in order to help maize farmers in Malawi develop more efficient production techniques. The foundation also aims to give teenagers the skills, such as mechanical and construction skills, needed to go out and work. James has also made connections with West Exe Technology College, Exeter. This college has brought to his attention the Malawian charity, Friends of Mulanje Orphans. The foundation funds the David James Foundation Scholarship at the University of Westminster, which funds a student from Malawi to study for a master's degree at Westminster. The charity has been supported by the Institution of Chemical Engineers (IChemE). James is also a global ambassador for the Special Olympics and works with Access Sport to provide sports provision in deprived areas of the United Kingdom.

In March 2024, James played for AFC Hutwood against Madeinheath United in the City of Southampton Sunday Football League Division One as a goodwill gesture after the club donated a number of football boots to the Football Rebooted charity of which he was an ambassador. He played the first half in goal and the second half outfield, scoring the winner with a free kick in a 2–1 victory.

=== Art and writing ===
James is an artist, and has auctioned several of his paintings for charity. He was the featured painter in episode three of the fourth series of Extraordinary Portraits, when he painted Gill Sayell. James also illustrated the children's book Harry's Magic Pockets: The Circus written by his friend, Steve Pearson.

He writes a regular column for The Observer newspaper, and donates his article fee to charity.

=== Bankruptcy ===
In May 2014, James was declared bankrupt. Despite earning an estimated £20m from his footballing career, owning several properties and having a lucrative contract modeling for Armani, James' debts had built up since his divorce from his wife, Tanya, in 2005.

In November 2014, James placed for sale hundreds of items of football memorabilia collected during his career, to pay off the debts. Items included 150 signed shirts, shorts and match balls as well as his customised Vauxhall Astra van and Raleigh Chopper bikes.

== Media career ==
=== Football broadcasting ===
Shortly before Euro 2012, James presented a BBC programme entitled Euro's Most Shocking Moments alongside Richard Bacon. He was also a pundit for the channel at the tournament in Poland and Ukraine.

James was one of BT Sport's first pundits in 2013. James worked as a pundit for Eurosport at the 2014 FIFA World Cup, and for India's Sony Ten at the 2018 FIFA World Cup. On 6 June 2021, James presented Football Scores with David James on classical music radio station Scala Radio.

=== Contests and game shows ===
James was a contestant on the seventeenth series of Strictly Come Dancing in 2019. He was partnered with Nadiya Bychkova and was the fourth celebrity to be eliminated after a dance-off with Mike Bushell and Katya Jones.

==== Strictly Come Dancing performances ====
Week No.	Dance/Song	Judges' score (Note: Individual judges' scores are listed in the following order: Craig Revel Horwood, Motsi Mabuse, Shirley Ballas, Bruno Tonioli.)				Total	Result
1	Foxtrot / "Three Lions"	3	4	5	5	17	No Elimination
2	Paso Doble / "España cañí"	2	3	2	3	10	Bottom two
3	American Smooth / "Kiss from a Rose"	4	4	4	4	16	Bottom two
4	Quickstep / "From Now On	6	7	7	8	28	Safe
5	Jive / "Such a Night"	3	4	4	5 (Note: Alfonso Ribeiro stood in as a guest judge this week.)	16	Eliminated

James has also been a guest on television game shows, including Countdown (2016), Go 8 Bit (2016), Richard Osman's House of Games (2020), Celebrity Catchphrase (2021), Taskmaster (2024) and Beat the Chasers (2024).

In March 2021, James won £1,250 for a homeless people's charity on Pointless Celebrities. In 2022, James competed on Celebrity Mastermind with his specialist subject being the artist Roy Lichtenstein. In that same year he appeared on a Soccer Aid edition of The Chase: Celebrity Special, breaking the celebrity record for most questions answered during the cash-builder segment of the show. He made another appearance on The Chase: Celebrity Special in 2023.

== Career statistics ==
=== Club ===
Appearances and goals by club, season and competition
Club	Season	League			National Cup (Note: Includes FA Cup, Icelandic Cup)		League Cup		Continental		Other		Total	
Club	Season	Division	Apps	Goals	Apps	Goals	Apps	Goals	Apps	Goals	Apps	Goals	Apps	Goals
Watford	1990–91	Second Division	46	0	1	0	2	0	—		0	0	49	0
Watford	1991–92	Second Division	43	0	1	0	4	0	—		1 (Note: Appearances in Full Members' Cup)	0	49	0
Watford	Total		89	0	2	0	6	0	—		1	0	98	0
Liverpool	1992–93	Premier League	29	0	0	0	1	0	1 (Note: Appearances in UEFA Cup Winners' Cup)	0	—		31	0
Liverpool	1993–94	Premier League	14	0	0	0	0	0	—		—		14	0
Liverpool	1994–95	Premier League	42	0	7	0	8	0	—		—		57	0
Liverpool	1995–96	Premier League	38	0	7	0	4	0	4 (Note: Appearances in UEFA Cup)	0	—		53	0
Liverpool	1996–97	Premier League	38	0	2	0	4	0	8	0	—		52	0
Liverpool	1997–98	Premier League	27	0	1	0	5	0	4	0	—		37	0
Liverpool	1998–99	Premier League	26	0	2	0	0	0	5	0	—		33	0
Liverpool	Total		214	0	19	0	22	0	22	0	—		277	0
Aston Villa	1999–2000	Premier League	29	0	5	0	5	0	—		—		39	0
Aston Villa	2000–01	Premier League	38	0	3	0	1	0	4 (Note: Appearances in UEFA Intertoto Cup)	0	—		46	0
Aston Villa	Total		67	0	8	0	6	0	4	0	—		85	0
West Ham United	2001–02	Premier League	26	0	3	0	0	0	—		—		29	0
West Ham United	2002–03	Premier League	38	0	2	0	2	0	—		—		42	0
West Ham United	2003–04	Championship	27	0	1	0	3	0	—		—		31	0
West Ham United	Total		91	0	6	0	5	0	—		—		102	0
Manchester City	2003–04	Premier League	17	0	—		—		—		—		17	0
Manchester City	2004–05	Premier League	38	0	1	0	0	0	—		—		39	0
Manchester City	2005–06	Premier League	38	0	5	0	1	0	—		—		44	0
Manchester City	Total		93	0	6	0	1	0	—		—		100	0
Portsmouth	2006–07	Premier League	38	0	2	0	1	0	—		—		41	0
Portsmouth	2007–08	Premier League	35	0	6	0	1	0	—		—		42	0
Portsmouth	2008–09	Premier League	36	0	3	0	1	0	5	0	1 (Note: Appearance in FA Community Shield)	0	46	0
Portsmouth	2009–10	Premier League	25	0	4	0	0	0	—		—		29	0
Portsmouth	Total		134	0	15	0	3	0	5	0	1	0	158	0
Bristol City	2010–11	Championship	45	0	1	0	0	0	—		—		46	0
Bristol City	2011–12	Championship	36	0	1	0	1	0	—		—		38	0
Bristol City	Total		81	0	2	0	1	0	—		—		84	0
AFC Bournemouth	2012–13	League One	19	0	0	0	—		—		—		19	0
ÍBV	2013	Úrvalsdeild	17	0	2	0	—		4 (Note: Appearances in UEFA Europa League)	0	—		23	0
Kerala Blasters	2014	Indian Super League	12	0	—		—		—		—		12	0
Career total			817	0	60	0	44	0	35	0	2	0	958	0

=== International ===
Appearances and goals by national team and year
National team	Year	Apps	Goals
England	1997	1	0
England	2000	1	0
England	2001	3	0
England	2002	5	0
England	2003	11	0
England	2004	9	0
England	2005	3	0
England	2006	1	0
England	2007	1	0
England	2008	10	0
England	2009	4	0
England	2010	4	0
Total		53	0

=== Managerial ===
Team	Nat	From	To	Record				
Team	Nat	From	To	G	W	D	L	Win %
Kerala Blasters	(India)	20 August 2014	20 December 2014	17	6	4	7	35.29
Kerala Blasters	(India)	3 January 2018	28 December 2018	24	6	9	9	25.00
Total				41	12	13	16	29.27

== Honours ==
Liverpool

- Football League Cup: 1994–95
- FA Cup runner-up: 1995–96

Aston Villa

- FA Cup runner-up: 1999–2000

Portsmouth

- FA Cup: 2007–08; runner-up: 2009–10

Bournemouth

- Football League One runner-up: 2012–13

Kerala Blasters

- Indian Super League runner-up: 2014

Individual

- Toulon Tournament Best Goalkeeper: 1991
- PFA Team of the Year: 1991–92 Second Division, 1995–96 Premier League, 2007–08 Premier League

== See also ==
- List of men's footballers with the most official appearances
