= 2002–03 West Ham United F.C. season =

English football team season

West Ham United
2002–03 season
- Chairman: Terry Brown
- Manager: Glenn Roeder (until 21 April); Sir Trevor Brooking (caretaker)
- Stadium: Boleyn Ground
- Premier League: 18th (relegated)
- FA Cup: Fourth round (eliminated by Manchester United)
- League Cup: Third round (eliminated by Oldham Athletic)
- Top goalscorer: League: Paolo Di Canio (9); All: Jermain Defoe (11)
- Average home league attendance: 34,432
Home colours	Away colours	Third colours

The 2002–03 season saw West Ham United relegated from the FA Premier League (known as the FA Barclaycard Premiership for sponsorship reasons) after a 10-year run in the top flight. West Ham were relegated to the First Division at the end of the season, finishing in 18th place.

== Season summary ==
Following a successful debut campaign for new manager Glenn Roeder the previous year that saw them finish 7th in the Premiership - two places short of a club record 5th three seasons earlier - hopes were high for the young squad to expand on this and aim for an equal or higher finish in the 2002–03 season. Despite boasting several current or future England internationals, including David James, Trevor Sinclair, Joe Cole, Jermain Defoe, Glen Johnson and Michael Carrick, a disastrous start to the season saw them win just three out of their first 24 matches, and the club found themselves bottom of the table at Christmas with just 16 points. Similarly poor results followed into the new year, as the club continued to struggle in the relegation battle and were knocked out of the FA Cup after a 6–0 defeat to Manchester United in January.

Their poor form in all competitions was put into perspective on 21 April 2003, when manager Glenn Roeder collapsed after a 1–0 Premiership win against Middlesbrough; it was revealed he was suffering from a non-malignant brain tumour, which was later operated on successfully. Following this, club legend Sir Trevor Brooking was named as caretaker manager, and West Ham's luck began to turn with a series of good results towards the end of the season that saw them go into the final day with a chance of staying up. Tied with 17th place Bolton Wanderers but far behind on goal difference, they headed into the last game of the season against Birmingham City needing a superior result to Bolton (and in the case of both teams winning, a 7-goal margin) to escape relegation. However, a 2–2 draw with goals from Les Ferdinand and Paolo Di Canio saw the Hammers relegated after Bolton defeated Middlesbrough 2–1 at the Reebok Stadium, sending them down to England's second division for the first time since 1992.

== Final league table ==
Pos	Team	Pld	W	D	L	GF	GA	GD	Pts	Qualification or relegation
1	Manchester United (C)	38	25	8	5	74	34	+40	83	Qualification for the Champions League group stage
2	Arsenal	38	23	9	6	85	42	+43	78	Qualification for the Champions League group stage
3	Newcastle United	38	21	6	11	63	48	+15	69	Qualification for the Champions League third qualifying round
4	Chelsea	38	19	10	9	68	38	+30	67	Qualification for the Champions League third qualifying round
5	Liverpool	38	18	10	10	61	41	+20	64	Qualification for the UEFA Cup first round (Note: Since Liverpool qualified for the UEFA Cup via the league, their place in the UEFA Cup as League Cup winners reverted to the league and was awarded to Blackburn Rovers as the highest-placed team not already qualified for European competitions.)
6	Blackburn Rovers	38	16	12	10	52	43	+9	60	Qualification for the UEFA Cup first round
7	Everton	38	17	8	13	48	49	−1	59	
8	Southampton	38	13	13	12	43	46	−3	52	Qualification for the UEFA Cup first round (Note: Since Arsenal qualified for the Champions League, their place in the UEFA Cup as FA Cup winners went to Southampton, who were the FA Cup runners-up.)
9	Manchester City	38	15	6	17	47	54	−7	51	Qualification for the UEFA Cup qualifying round (Note: Manchester City qualified as the highest-ranked team not already qualified for European competitions of Premiership Fair Play League by The Football Association, the top association among UEFA Fair Play ranking winners.)
10	Tottenham Hotspur	38	14	8	16	51	62	−11	50	
11	Middlesbrough	38	13	10	15	48	44	+4	49	
12	Charlton Athletic	38	14	7	17	45	56	−11	49	
13	Birmingham City	38	13	9	16	41	49	−8	48	
14	Fulham	38	13	9	16	41	50	−9	48	
15	Leeds United	38	14	5	19	58	57	+1	47	
16	Aston Villa	38	12	9	17	42	47	−5	45	
17	Bolton Wanderers	38	10	14	14	41	51	−10	44	
18	West Ham United (R)	38	10	12	16	42	59	−17	42	Relegation to Football League First Division
19	West Bromwich Albion (R)	38	6	8	24	29	65	−36	26	Relegation to Football League First Division
20	Sunderland (R)	38	4	7	27	21	65	−44	19	Relegation to Football League First Division

Source: Premier League
Rules for classification: 1) points; 2) goal difference; 3) number of goals scored.
(C) Champions; (R) Relegated

== Squad ==
Note: Flags indicate national team as defined under FIFA eligibility rules; some limited exceptions apply. Players may hold more than one non-FIFA nationality.

No.	Pos.	Nation	Player
1	GK	ENG	David James
2	DF	CZE	Tomáš Řepka
3	DF	ENG	Nigel Winterburn
4	MF	SCO	Don Hutchison
5	MF	ENG	Lee Bowyer
6	MF	ENG	Michael Carrick
7	DF	SCO	Christian Dailly
8	MF	ENG	Trevor Sinclair
9	FW	ENG	Jermain Defoe
10	FW	ITA	Paolo Di Canio
11	MF	NIR	Steve Lomas
14	FW	FRA	Frédéric Kanouté
15	DF	IRL	Gary Breen
16	MF	ENG	John Moncur
17	GK	NED	Raimond van der Gouw
18	FW	FRA	Youssef Sofiane
19	DF	ENG	Ian Pearce
20	DF	ENG	Scott Minto

No.	Pos.	Nation	Player
21	MF	AUS	Richard Garcia
22	FW	ENG	Les Ferdinand
23	DF	ENG	Glen Johnson
24	DF	ENG	Rufus Brevett
25	MF	FRA	Édouard Cissé (on loan from Paris Saint-Germain)
26	MF	ENG	Joe Cole (captain)
27	MF	IRL	Shaun Byrne
28	MF	ENG	David Noble
29	FW	GUI	Titi Camara
30	DF	FRA	Sébastien Schemmel
31	GK	IRL	David Forde
32	GK	ENG	Stephen Bywater
34	DF	IRL	Clive Delaney
35	DF	ENG	Anton Ferdinand
36	MF	IRL	Daryl McMahon
37	MF	ENG	Leon Britton
38	FW	ENG	James Allen
39	DF	ENG	Izzy Iriekpen

=== Left club during season ===
Note: Flags indicate national team as defined under FIFA eligibility rules; some limited exceptions apply. Players may hold more than one non-FIFA nationality.

No.	Pos.	Nation	Player
5	DF	SVK	Vladimír Labant (on loan to Sparta Prague)
22	MF	TTO	Brent Rahim (on loan from Levski Sofia)
28	MF	FRA	Laurent Courtois (to Istres)

No.	Pos.	Nation	Player
33	FW	ENG	Billy Mehmet (to Dunfermline Athletic)
34	MF	NIR	Grant McCann (to Cheltenham Town)
35	DF	ENG	Louis Riddle (to Stevenage Borough)

== Results ==
=== Premier League ===
19 August 2002 1	Newcastle United	4–0	West Ham United	Newcastle upon Tyne
20:00 BST	LuaLua 61', 72'; Shearer 76'; Solano 86'	Report		Stadium: St James' Park; Attendance: 51,072; Referee: Paul Durkin

24 August 2002 2	West Ham United	2–2	Arsenal	London
15:00 BST	J. Cole 44'; Kanouté 53'	Report	Henry 65'; Wiltord 88'	Stadium: Boleyn Ground; Attendance: 35,048; Referee: Neale Barry

31 August 2002 3	West Ham United	0–2	Charlton Athletic	London
15:00 BST		Report	Jensen 4'; Fortune 44'	Stadium: Boleyn Ground; Attendance: 32,424; Referee: Jeff Winter

11 September 2002 4	West Ham United	0–1	West Bromwich Albion	London
19:45 BST		Report	Roberts 28'	Stadium: Boleyn Ground; Attendance: 34,957; Referee: Andy D'Urso

15 September 2002 5	Tottenham Hotspur	3–2	West Ham United	London
16:00 BST	Davies 62'; Sheringham 71'; Gardner 89'	Report	Kanouté 66'; Sinclair 77'	Stadium: White Hart Lane; Attendance: 36,005; Referee: Uriah Rennie

21 September 2002 6	West Ham United	0–0	Manchester City	London
15:00 BST		Report		Stadium: Boleyn Ground; Attendance: 35,550; Referee: Graham Barber

28 September 2002 7	Chelsea	2–3	West Ham United	London
15:00 BST	Hasselbaink 21' (pen.); Zola 74'	Report	Defoe 40'; Di Canio 49', 84'	Stadium: Stamford Bridge; Attendance: 38,929; Referee: Mike Dean

5 October 2002 8	West Ham United	1–2	Birmingham City	London
15:00 BST	Cole 17'	Report	John 4', 43'	Stadium: Boleyn Ground; Attendance: 35,010; Referee: Phil Dowd

19 October 2002 9	Sunderland	0–1	West Ham United	Sunderland
15:00 BST		Report	Sinclair 23'	Stadium: Stadium of Light; Attendance: 44,352; Referee: Graham Barber

23 October 2002 10	Fulham	0–1	West Ham United	London
19:45 BST		Report	Di Canio 90' (pen.)	Stadium: Loftus Road; Attendance: 15,858; Referee: Rob Styles

27 October 2002 11	West Ham United	0–1	Everton	London
16:05 GMT		Report	Carsley 70'	Stadium: Boleyn Ground; Attendance: 34,117; Referee: Alan Wiley

2 November 2002 12	Liverpool	2–0	West Ham United	Liverpool
15:00 GMT	Owen 28', 55'	Report		Stadium: Anfield; Attendance: 44,048; Referee: Eddie Wolstenholme

10 November 2002 13	West Ham United	3–4	Leeds United	London
	Di Canio 21', 50' (pen.); Sinclair 74'	Report	Barmby 11'; Kewell 28', 51'; Viduka 45'	Stadium: Boleyn Ground; Attendance: 33,297; Referee: Steve Dunn

17 November 2002 14	West Ham United	1–1	Manchester United	London
16:00 GMT	Defoe 86'	Report	Van Nistelrooy 38'	Stadium: Boleyn Ground; Attendance: 35,049; Referee: Mark Halsey

23 November 2002 15	Aston Villa	4–1	West Ham United	Birmingham
15:00 GMT	Hendrie 29'; Leonhardsen 59'; Dublin 70'; Vassell 80'	Report	Di Canio 70'	Stadium: Villa Park; Attendance: 33,279; Referee: Chris Foy

2 December 2002 16	West Ham United	0–1	Southampton	London
20:00 GMT		Report	Beattie 90'	Stadium: Boleyn Ground; Attendance: 28,844; Referee: Mike Riley

7 December 2002 17	Middlesbrough	2–2	West Ham United	Middlesbrough
15:00 GMT	Németh 58'; Ehiogu 88'	Report	Cole 46'; Pearce 76'	Stadium: Riverside Stadium; Attendance: 28,283; Referee: Graham Poll

14 December 2002 18	Manchester United	3–0	West Ham United	Manchester
	Solskjær 15'; Verón 17'; Schemmel 61' (o.g.)	Report		Stadium: Old Trafford; Attendance: 67,555; Referee: Rob Styles

21 December 2002 19	West Ham United	1–1	Bolton Wanderers	London
15:00 BST	Pearce 17'	Report	Ricketts 65'	Stadium: Boleyn Ground; Attendance: 34,892; Referee: Steve Bennett

26 December 2002 20	West Ham United	1–1	Fulham	London
	Sinclair 65'	Report	Sava 49'	Stadium: Boleyn Ground; Attendance: 35,025; Referee: Dermot Gallagher

28 December 2002 21	Blackburn Rovers	2–2	West Ham United	Blackburn
	Duff 4'; Cole 78'	Report	Taylor 24' (o.g.); Defoe 86'	Stadium: Ewood Park; Attendance: 24,998; Referee: Alan Wiley

11 January 2003 22	West Ham United	2–2	Newcastle United	London
15:00 BST	Cole 14'; Defoe 45'	Report	Bellamy 9'; Jenas 81'	Stadium: Boleyn Ground; Attendance: 35,048; Referee: Jeff Winter

19 January 2003 23	Arsenal	3–1	West Ham United	London
	Henry 21' (pen.), 71', 86'	Report	Defoe 40'	Stadium: Highbury; Attendance: 38,053; Referee: Mike Dean

22 January 2003 24	Charlton Athletic	4–2	West Ham United	London
	Jensen 42'; Parker 45', 51'; Kishishev 90'	Report	Rufus 19' (o.g.); Fish 62' (o.g.)	Stadium: The Valley; Attendance: 26,340; Referee: Eddie Wolstenholme

29 January 2003 25	West Ham United	2–1	Blackburn Rovers	London
19:45 BST	Di Canio 58' (pen.); Defoe 89'	Report	Yorke 38'	Stadium: Boleyn Ground; Attendance: 34,743; Referee: Alan Wiley

2 February 2003 26	West Ham United	0–3	Liverpool	London
		Report	Baroš 7'; Gerrard 9'; Heskey 67'	Stadium: Boleyn Ground; Attendance: 35,033; Referee: Matt Messias

8 February 2003 27	Leeds United	1–0	West Ham United	Leeds
	S. Johnson 20'	Report		Stadium: Elland Road; Attendance: 40,126; Referee: Dermot Gallagher

23 February 2003 28	West Bromwich Albion	1–2	West Ham United	West Bromwich
	Dichio 50'	Report	Sinclair 45', 67'	Stadium: The Hawthorns; Attendance: 27,042; Referee: Mike Dean

1 March 2003 29	West Ham United	2–0	Tottenham Hotspur	London
	Ferdinand 31'; Carrick 47'	Report		Stadium: Boleyn Ground; Attendance: 35,049; Referee: Neale Barry

15 March 2003 30	Everton	0–0	West Ham United	Liverpool
		Report		Stadium: Goodison Park; Attendance: 40,158; Referee: Mark Halsey

22 March 2003 31	West Ham United	2–0	Sunderland	London
	Defoe 24'; Kanouté 65'	Report		Stadium: Boleyn Ground; Attendance: 35,033; Referee: Rob Styles

5 April 2003 32	Southampton	1–1	West Ham United	Southampton
	Beattie 44'	Report	Defoe 83'	Stadium: St Mary's Stadium; Attendance: 31,941; Referee: Matt Messias

12 April 2003 33	West Ham United	2–2	Aston Villa	London
	Sinclair 15'; Kanouté 65'	Report	Vassell 36' (pen.); Leonhardsen 53'	Stadium: Boleyn Ground; Attendance: 35,029; Referee: Mike Dean

19 April 2003 34	Bolton Wanderers	1–0	West Ham United	Bolton
	Okocha 38'	Report		Stadium: Reebok Stadium; Attendance: 27,160; Referee: Uriah Rennie

21 April 2003 35	West Ham United	1–0	Middlesbrough	London
	Sinclair 77'	Report		Stadium: Boleyn Ground; Attendance: 35,019; Referee: Alan Wiley

27 April 2003 36	Manchester City	0–1	West Ham United	Manchester
		Report	Kanouté 81'	Stadium: Maine Road; Attendance: 34,815; Referee: Rob Styles

3 May 2003 37	West Ham United	1–0	Chelsea	London
	Di Canio 71'	Report		Stadium: Boleyn Ground; Attendance: 35,042; Referee: Andy D'Urso

11 May 2003 38	Birmingham City	2–2	West Ham United	Birmingham
	Horsfield 79'; John 87'	Report	Ferdinand 66'; Di Canio 89'	Stadium: St Andrew's; Attendance: 29,505; Referee: Graham Poll

=== League Cup ===
1 October 2002 Second round	Chesterfield	1–1 (a.e.t.) (4–5 p)	West Ham United	Chesterfield
	Brandon 52'	Report	Defoe 13'	Stadium: Saltergate; Attendance: 7,102; Referee: Andy Hall
	Penalties
	Burt (penalty scored); Ebdon (penalty scored); Allott (penalty missed); Hudson (penalty scored); Brandon (penalty scored)		Di Canio (penalty scored); Sinclair (penalty scored); Minto (penalty scored); Lomas (penalty scored); Carrick (penalty scored)

6 November 2002 Third round	West Ham United	0–1	Oldham Athletic	London
		Report	Corazzin 42'	Stadium: Boleyn Ground; Attendance: 21,919; Referee: Uriah Rennie

=== FA Cup ===
4 January 2003 Third round	West Ham United	3–2	Nottingham Forest	London
	Defoe 26', 85'; Cole 61'	Report	Harewood 17'; Reid 46'	Stadium: Boleyn Ground; Attendance: 29,612; Referee: Paul Durkin

26 January 2003 Fourth round	Manchester United	6–0	West Ham United	Manchester
	Giggs 8', 29'; Van Nistelrooy 49', 58'; P. Neville 50'; Solskjær 69'	Report		Stadium: Old Trafford; Attendance: 67,181; Referee: Steve Bennett

== Statistics ==
=== Overview ===
Competition	Record							
Competition	P	W	D	L	GF	GA	GD	Win %
Premier League	38	10	12	16	42	59	−17	26.32
FA Cup	2	1	0	1	3	8	−5	50.00
League Cup	2	0	1	1	1	2	−1	0.00
Total	42	11	13	18	46	69	−23	26.19

=== Goalscorers ===
Rank	Pos	No.	Nat	Name	Premier League	FA Cup	League Cup	Total
1	ST	9	(England)	Jermain Defoe	8	2	1	11
2	ST	10	(Italy)	Paolo Di Canio	9	0	0	9
3	MF	8	(England)	Trevor Sinclair	8	0	0	8
4	ST	14	(France)	Frédéric Kanouté	5	0	0	5
4	MF	26	(England)	Joe Cole	4	1	0	5
6	Own goals				3	0	0	3
7	DF	19	(England)	Ian Pearce	2	0	0	2
7	ST	22	(England)	Les Ferdinand	2	0	0	2
9	MF	6	(England)	Michael Carrick	0	0	1	1
Totals					42	3	1	46

=== League position by matchday ===
Matchday	1	2	3	4	5	6	7	8	9	10	11	12	13	14	15	16	17	18	19	20	21	22	23	24	25	26	27	28	29	30	31	32	33	34	35	36	37	38
Ground	A	H	H	H	A	H	A	H	A	A	H	A	H	H	A	H	A	A	H	H	A	H	A	A	H	H	A	A	H	A	H	A	H	H	H	A	H	A
Result	L	D	L	L	L	D	W	L	W	W	L	L	L	D	L	L	D	L	D	D	D	D	L	L	W	L	L	W	W	D	W	D	D	L	W	W	W	D
Position	20	16	19	20	20	20	20	20	16	14	15	16	18	19	20	20	20	20	20	20	20	19	20	20	18	19	19	18	18	18	17	18	18	18	18	18	18	18

A = Away; H = Home; W = Win; D = Draw; L = Loss

=== Appearances and goals ===
No.	Pos	Nat	Player	Total		Premier League		FA Cup		League Cup	
No.	Pos	Nat	Player	Apps	Goals	Apps	Goals	Apps	Goals	Apps	Goals
Goalkeepers
1	GK	(England) ENG	David James	42	0	38	0	2	0	2	0
Defenders
2	DF	(Czech Republic) CZE	Tomáš Řepka	34	0	32	0	0+1	0	1	0
3	DF	(England) ENG	Nigel Winterburn	20	0	16+2	0	1	0	0+1	0
5	DF	(Slovakia) SVK	Vladimír Labant	1	0	0+1	0	0	0	0	0
7	DF	(Scotland) SCO	Christian Dailly	29	0	23+3	0	1+1	0	1	0
15	DF	(Republic of Ireland) IRL	Gary Breen	18	0	9+5	0	2	0	2	0
19	DF	(England) ENG	Ian Pearce	33	2	26+4	2	2	0	1	0
20	DF	(England) ENG	Scott Minto	15	0	9+3	0	1	0	2	0
23	DF	(England) ENG	Glen Johnson	16	0	14+1	0	0+1	0	0	0
24	DF	(England) ENG	Rufus Brevett	13	0	12+1	0	0	0	0	0
30	DF	(France) FRA	Sebastien Schemmel	19	0	15+1	0	1	0	1+1	0
Midfielders
4	MF	(Scotland) SCO	Don Hutchison	10	0	0+10	0	0	0	0	0
5	MF	(England) ENG	Lee Bowyer	11	0	10	0	1	0	0	0
6	MF	(England) ENG	Michael Carrick	34	1	28+2	1	2	0	2	0
8	MF	(England) ENG	Trevor Sinclair	41	8	36+2	8	2	0	1	0
11	MF	(Northern Ireland) NIR	Steve Lomas	32	0	27+2	0	1	0	2	0
16	MF	(England) ENG	John Moncur	7	0	0+7	0	0	0	0	0
21	MF	(Australia) AUS	Richard Garcia	2	0	0	0	0+1	0	0+1	0
25	MF	(France) FRA	Édouard Cissé	28	0	18+7	0	2	0	1	0
26	MF	(England) ENG	Joe Cole	40	5	36	4	2	1	2	0
Forwards
9	FW	(England) ENG	Jermain Defoe	42	11	29+9	8	2	2	2	1
10	FW	(Italy) ITA	Paolo Di Canio	19	9	16+2	9	0	0	1	0
14	FW	(France) FRA	Frédéric Kanouté	17	5	12+5	5	0	0	0	0
22	FW	(England) ENG	Les Ferdinand	14	2	12+2	2	0	0	0	0
29	FW	(Guinea) GUI	Titi Camara	6	0	0+4	0	0+1	0	1	0

== Transfers ==
=== In ===
Date	Pos.	Name	From	Fee
26 June 2002	ST	(France) Youssef Sofiane	(France) Auxerre	Free
28 June 2002	GK	(Netherlands) Raimond van der Gouw	(England) Manchester United	Free
29 July 2002	DF	(Republic of Ireland) Gary Breen	(England) Coventry City	Free
6 August 2002	MF	(France) Édouard Cissé	(France) Paris Saint-Germain	Loan
16 August 2002	MF	(Trinidad and Tobago) Brent Rahim	(Bulgaria) Levski Sofia	Loan
11 January 2003	MF	(England) Lee Bowyer	(England) Leeds United	£100,000
21 January 2003	ST	(England) Les Ferdinand	(England) Tottenham Hotspur	Undisclosed
31 January 2003	DF	(England) Rufus Brevett	(England) Fulham	Undisclosed

=== Out ===
Date	Pos.	Name	From	Fee
May 2002	DF	(Saint Kitts and Nevis) Adam Newton	(England) Peterborough United	Free
May 2002	DF	(Norway) Ragnvald Soma	(Norway) Bryne FK	Free
29 May 2002	DF	(Australia) Hayden Foxe	(England) Portsmouth	£400,000
27 June 2002	DF	(Cameroon) Rigobert Song	(France) Lens	Free
1 July 2002	GK	(Trinidad and Tobago) Shaka Hislop	(England) Portsmouth	Free
25 July 2002	GK	(Canada) Craig Forrest	Retired	
29 July 2002	DF	(England) Gary Charles	Retired	
20 August 2002	ST	(England) Paul Kitson	(England) Brighton & Hove Albion	Free
13 September 2002	DF	(England) Steve Potts	(England) Dagenham & Redbridge	Free
12 December 2002	DF	(Slovakia) Vladimír Labant	(Czech Republic) Sparta Prague	Loan
January 2003	MF	(Northern Ireland) Grant McCann	(England) Cheltenham Town	£50,000
15 January 2003	MF	(France) Laurent Courtois	(France) FC Istres	Free
