= 2006–07 Portsmouth F.C. season =

Portsmouth
2006–07 season
- Chairman: Milan Mandarić (until September); Alexandre Gaydamak
- Manager: Harry Redknapp
- Stadium: Fratton Park
- Premier League: 9th
- FA Cup: Fourth round
- League Cup: Third round
- Top goalscorer: League: Nwankwo Kanu (10); All: Nwankwo Kanu (12)
- Highest home attendance: 20,223 vs. Manchester Utd (7 April 2007)
- Lowest home attendance: 19,105 vs. Bolton Wanderers (25 September 2006)
- Average home league attendance: 19,664

During the 2006–07 English football season, Portsmouth competed in the FA Premier League.

== Season summary ==
After several seasons of struggle in English football's top flight, Portsmouth enjoyed one of their best seasons in many years as they challenged for European qualification, ultimately falling short with a nonetheless creditable ninth-place finish.

== Kit ==
The team kit was manufactured by German sportswear manufacturer Jako and sponsored by Japanese electronics company Oki.

== Final league table ==
Pos	Team	Pld	W	D	L	GF	GA	GD	Pts	Qualification or relegation
7	Bolton Wanderers	38	16	8	14	47	52	−5	56	Qualification for the UEFA Cup first round (Note: Since both finalists of the FA Cup (Manchester United and Chelsea) and the League Cup winners (Chelsea) were qualified for the Champions League, their UEFA Cup spots were given to the 6th- and 7th-placed Premier League teams.)
8	Reading	38	16	7	15	52	47	+5	55	
9	Portsmouth	38	14	12	12	45	42	+3	54	
10	Blackburn Rovers	38	15	7	16	52	54	−2	52	Qualification for the Intertoto Cup third round (Note: The highest-placed team who applied for the Intertoto Cup and not in an automatic UEFA Cup spot was awarded with a place in that competition. Blackburn Rovers occupied the Intertoto place, because Portsmouth and Reading did not apply. A further place in the UEFA Cup was up for grabs via the Premiership Fair Play League. The winner is placed into a draw with the winners of Fair Play leagues in other countries. The representatives from the two countries that come out of the hat first are given a place in the UEFA Cup first qualifying round. Since the winners of the Premiership Fair Play League, Tottenham Hotspur, had already qualified for the UEFA Cup by virtue of their league position, their place in the Fair Play draw was given to Aston Villa. However, the places in the UEFA Cup were awarded to the representatives from Finland and Norway.)
11	Aston Villa	38	11	17	10	43	41	+2	50	

Source: Premier League
Rules for classification: 1) points; 2) goal difference; 3) number of goals scored.

== Results ==
Matchday	1	2	3	4	5	6	7	8	9	10	11	12	13	14	15	16	17	18	19	20	21	22	23	24	25	26	27	28	29	30	31	32	33	34	35	36	37	38
Ground	H	A	A	H	A	H	A	H	A	H	A	H	H	A	A	H	H	A	H	A	A	H	A	H	H	A	H	A	H	A	A	H	A	H	A	H	A	H
Result	W	D	W	W	W	L	L	W	L	W	L	D	W	L	D	D	W	D	W	W	L	D	D	L	D	L	W	L	L	D	D	W	L	W	D	W	L	D
Position	3	2	2	2	1	3	4	4	5	5	5	6	4	5	4	4	4	6	6	5	6	6	6	6	6	7	7	8	9	9	9	8	8	7	8	8	9	9

Source: WorldFootball.com
A = Away; H = Home; W = Win; D = Draw; L = Loss

=== Premier League ===
19 August 2006 1	Portsmouth	3–0	Blackburn Rovers	Portsmouth
15:00	Taylor (yellow card) 11'; Todorov 26'; Stefanović (yellow card) 45'; Kanu 62', 84'	Report	Neill (yellow card) 27' (yellow card) 65' (red card); Todd (red card) 90'	Stadium: Fratton Park; Attendance: 19,523; Referee: Alan Wiley

23 August 2006 2	Manchester City	0–0	Portsmouth	Manchester
19:45		Report		Stadium: City of Manchester Stadium; Attendance: 37,214; Referee: Dermot Gallagher

28 August 2006 3	Middlesbrough	0–4	Portsmouth	Middlesbrough
		Report	Kanu 7', 57'; Benjani 50'; Todorov 90'	Stadium: Riverside Stadium; Attendance: 24,834; Referee: Chris Foy

9 September 2006 4	Portsmouth	1–0	Wigan Athletic	Portsmouth
15:00	Benjani 49'	Report	Hall (yellow card) 76'	Stadium: Fratton Park; Attendance: 19,508; Referee: Peter Walton

16 September 2006 5	Charlton Athletic	0–1	Portsmouth	Charlton, London
12:45		Report	LuaLua 74'	Stadium: The Valley; Attendance: 26,130; Referee: Phil Dowd

25 September 2006 6	Portsmouth	0–1	Bolton Wanderers	Portsmouth
20:00		Report	Nolan 22'	Stadium: Fratton Park; Attendance: 19,105; Referee: Uriah Rennie

1 October 2006 7	Tottenham Hotspur	2–1	Portsmouth	Haringey, London
	Murphy 2'; Defoe 35' (pen.)	Report	Kanu 40'	Stadium: White Hart Lane; Attendance: 36,063; Referee: Chris Foy

14 October 2006 8	Portsmouth	2–0	West Ham United	Portsmouth
15:00	Kanu 24'; Cole 80'	Report		Stadium: Fratton Park; Attendance: 20,142; Referee: Graham Poll

21 October 2006 9	Chelsea	2–1	Portsmouth	Fulham, London
	Shevchenko 55'; Ballack 57'		Benjani 69'	Stadium: Stamford Bridge

28 October 2006 10	Portsmouth	3–1	Reading	Portsmouth
15:00	Gunnarsson 10' (o.g.); Kanu 52'; Mendes 65'	Report	Doyle 84'	Stadium: Fratton Park; Attendance: 20,146; Referee: Phil Dowd

4 November 2006 11	Manchester United	3–0	Portsmouth	Trafford, Greater Manchester
15:00	Saha 3' (pen.); Ronaldo 10'; Vidić 66'	Report		Stadium: Old Trafford; Attendance: 76,004; Referee: Mike Dean

11 November 2006 12	Portsmouth	1–1	Fulham	Portsmouth
15:00	Cole 74'	Report	Knight 57'	Stadium: Fratton Park; Attendance: 19,563; Referee: Steve Bennett

18 November 2006 13	Portsmouth	2–1	Watford	Portsmouth
15:00	Kanu 44'; LuaLua 89' (pen.)	Report	Demerit 32'	Stadium: Fratton Park; Attendance: 19,738; Referee: Chris Foy

26 November 2006 14	Newcastle United	1–0	Portsmouth	St James' Park
13:30	Sibierski 69'			Attendance: 48,743; Referee: Mark Halsey

29 November 2006 15	Liverpool	0–0	Portsmouth

2 December 2006 16	Portsmouth	2–2	Aston Villa	Portsmouth
15:00	Taylor 52', 80' (pen.)	Report	Barry 37' (pen.); Ángel 82'	Stadium: Fratton Park; Attendance: 20,042; Referee: Uriah Rennie

9 December 2006 17	Portsmouth	2–0	Everton	Portsmouth
15:00	Taylor 14'; Kanu 26'	Report		Stadium: Fratton Park; Attendance: 19,528; Referee: Mark Clattenburg

16 December 2006 18	Arsenal	2–2	Portsmouth
15:00	Adebayor 58'; Gilberto 60'		Pamarot 45'; Taylor 47'

23 December 2006 19	Portsmouth	3–1	Sheffield United	Portsmouth
15:00	Kozluk 48' (o.g.); Campbell 54'; Pamarot 68'	Report	Hulse 4'	Stadium: Fratton Park; Attendance: 20,164; Referee: Graham Poll

26 December 2006 20	West Ham United	1–2	Portsmouth
	Sheringham 81'		Primus 16', 38'

30 December 2006 21	Bolton Wanderers	3–2	Portsmouth
	Faye 30'; Campo 40'; Anelka 62'		Taylor 2'; Cole 89'

1 January 2007 22	Portsmouth	1–1	Tottenham Hotspur	Portsmouth
15:00	Benjani 29'	Report	Malbranque 50'	Stadium: Fratton Park; Attendance: 20,194; Referee: Andre Marriner

13 January 2007 23	Sheffield United	1–1	Portsmouth
	Quinn 22'		O'Neil 81'

20 January 2007 24	Portsmouth	0–1	Charlton Athletic	Portsmouth
15:00		Report	Faye 79'	Stadium: Fratton Park; Attendance: 19,567; Referee: Mark Clattenburg

30 January 2007 25	Portsmouth	0–0	Middlesbrough	Portsmouth
19:45				Stadium: Fratton Park; Attendance: 19,820; Referee: Dermot Gallagher

3 February 2007 26	Wigan Athletic	1–0	Portsmouth
	McCulloch 68'

10 February 2007 27	Portsmouth	2–1	Manchester City	Portsmouth
15:00	Mendes 5'; Kanu 81'	Report	Corradi 62'	Stadium: Fratton Park; Attendance: 19,344; Referee: Mike Dean

25 February 2007 28	Blackburn Rovers	3–0	Portsmouth
	Nonda 1', 25'; Warnock 50'

3 March 2007 29	Portsmouth	0–2	Chelsea	Portsmouth
17:15		Report	Ballack (yellow card) 25'; Drogba 33'; Makélélé (yellow card) 68'; Kalou 82'	Stadium: Fratton Park; Attendance: 20,219; Referee: Mark Halsey

17 March 2007 30	Reading	0–0	Portsmouth

31 March 2007 31	Fulham	1–1	Portsmouth	Craven Cottage
15:00	Pearce 90'		Kranjčar 4'	Attendance: 22,806

7 April 2007 32	Portsmouth	2–1	Manchester United	Portsmouth
17:15	Taylor 30'; Ferdinand 89' (o.g.)	Report	O'Shea 90'	Stadium: Fratton Park; Attendance: 20,223; Referee: Mark Clattenburg

9 April 2007 33	Watford	4–2	Portsmouth	Watford, Hertfordshire
	Bouazza 28' (pen.), 73'; Mahon 45'; Priskin 51'	Report	Taylor 16'; Mvuemba 81'	Stadium: Vicarage Road; Attendance: 18,119; Referee: Lee Mason

14 April 2007 34	Portsmouth	2–1	Newcastle United	Portsmouth
15:00	Benjani 7'; Taylor 59'	Report	Emre 69' (pen.)	Stadium: Fratton Park; Attendance: 20,165; Referee: Chris Foy

22 April 2007 35	Aston Villa	0–0	Portsmouth	Villa Park
16:00				Attendance: 31,745; Referee: Martin Atkinson

28 April 2007 36	Portsmouth	2–1	Liverpool	Portsmouth
15:00	Benjani 27'; Kranjčar 32'	Report	Hyypiä 59'	Stadium: Fratton Park; Attendance: 20,201; Referee: Peter Walton

5 May 2007 37	Everton	3–0	Portsmouth
	Arteta 59' (pen.); Yobo 62'; Naysmith 90'

13 May 2007 38	Portsmouth	0–0	Arsenal	Portsmouth
15:00		Report		Stadium: Fratton Park; Attendance: 20,188; Referee: Graham Poll

== Players ==
=== First-team squad ===
Squad at end of season

Note: Flags indicate national team as defined under FIFA eligibility rules; some limited exceptions apply. Players may hold more than one non-FIFA nationality.

No.	Pos.	Nation	Player
1	GK	ENG	David James
2	DF	ENG	Linvoy Primus
3	DF	SRB	Dejan Stefanović (captain)
4	DF	ENG	Glen Johnson (on loan from Chelsea)
5	DF	IRL	Andy O'Brien (Note: O'Brien was born in Harrogate, England, and represented England at U-18 level, but also qualified to represent the Republic of Ireland internationally and represented the Republic of Ireland at U-21 level before making his international debut for the Republic of Ireland in 2001.)
6	DF	MLI	Djimi Traoré (Note: Traoré was born in Saint-Ouen, France, but also qualified to represent Mali internationally and made his international debut for Mali in 2004.)
8	FW	ENG	Andy Cole
9	FW	BUL	Svetoslav Todorov
10	DF	CMR	Lauren
11	DF	FRA	Noé Pamarot
14	MF	ENG	Matthew Taylor
19	MF	CRO	Niko Kranjčar

No.	Pos.	Nation	Player
22	MF	SCO	Richard Hughes
23	DF	ENG	Sol Campbell
24	DF	WAL	Richard Duffy
25	FW	ZIM	Benjani Mwaruwari
26	MF	ENG	Gary O'Neil
27	FW	NGA	Nwankwo Kanu
28	MF	ENG	Sean Davis
29	MF	CMR	Roudolphe Douala (on loan from Sporting CP)
30	MF	POR	Pedro Mendes
32	FW	COD	Lomana LuaLua
34	MF	COD	Arnold Mvuemba (Note: Mvuemba was born in Alençon, France, and represented France at U-21 level, but also qualified to represent the Democratic Republic of the Congo internationally and made his international debut for the DR Congo in 2005.) (on loan from Rennes)

=== Left club during season ===
Note: Flags indicate national team as defined under FIFA eligibility rules; some limited exceptions apply. Players may hold more than one non-FIFA nationality.

No.	Pos.	Nation	Player
6	MF	POR	Manuel Fernandes (on loan from Benfica)
7	MF	ENG	David Thompson (to Bolton Wanderers)
16	DF	ENG	Andy Griffin (on loan to Stoke City)
17	MF	SRB	Ognjen Koroman (Note: Koroman was born in Pale, SFR Yugoslavia (now Bosnia and Herzegovina), but also qualified to represent Serbia and its predecessor Serbia and Montenegro internationally and made his international debut for Serbia and Montenegro in 2002.) (on loan from Terek Grozny)

No.	Pos.	Nation	Player
20	MF	CRO	Ivica Mornar (released)
33	GK	IRL	Dean Kiely (Note: Kiely was born in Salford, England, and represented England at U-15, U-16, and U-18 level, but also qualified to represent the Republic of Ireland internationally and represented the Republic of Ireland at B level before making his international debut for the Republic of Ireland in November 1999.) (to West Bromwich Albion)
34	FW	ENG	James Keene (to IF Elfsborg)

=== Reserve squad ===
The following players did not appear for the first team this season.

Note: Flags indicate national team as defined under FIFA eligibility rules; some limited exceptions apply. Players may hold more than one non-FIFA nationality.

No.	Pos.	Nation	Player
15	GK	ENG	Jamie Ashdown
21	MF	FRA	Franck Songo'o (Note: Songo'o was born in Yaoundé, Cameroon and represented Cameroon at U-23 level, but was raised in France and represented France at U-19 level before making his international debut for Cameroon in September 2008.)

No.	Pos.	Nation	Player
31	GK	CAN	Asmir Begović (Note: Begović was born in Trebinje, SFR Yugoslavia (now Bosnia and Herzegovina), but was raised in Germany between the age of 4 and 10 and Canada from the age of 10 and represented Canada at U-20 level before making his international debut for Bosnia and Herzegovina in October 2009.)
35	GK	ENG	Nicholas Jordan

== Statistics ==
=== Appearances and goals ===
No.	Pos	Nat	Player	Total		Premier League		FA Cup		League Cup	
No.	Pos	Nat	Player	Apps	Goals	Apps	Goals	Apps	Goals	Apps	Goals
Goalkeepers
1	GK	(England) ENG	David James	41	0	38	0	2	0	1	0
Defenders
2	DF	(England) ENG	Linvoy Primus	39	2	36	2	2	0	1	0
3	DF	(Serbia) SRB	Dejan Stefanović	20	0	20	0	0	0	0	0
4	DF	(England) ENG	Glen Johnson	27	1	25	1	2	0	0	0
5	DF	(Republic of Ireland) IRL	Andy O'Brien	5	0	1+2	0	0	0	2	0
6	DF	(Mali) MLI	Djimi Traoré	10	0	10	0	0	0	0	0
10	DF	(Cameroon) CMR	Lauren	11	0	9+1	0	1	0	0	0
11	DF	(France) FRA	Noé Pamarot	25	2	21+2	2	0	0	2	0
23	DF	(England) ENG	Sol Campbell	34	1	32	1	2	0	0	0
24	DF	(Wales) WAL	Richard Duffy	1	0	0	0	0	0	1	0
Midfielders
14	MF	(England) ENG	Matthew Taylor	39	9	30+5	8	2	0	2	1
19	MF	(Croatia) CRO	Niko Kranjčar	28	2	11+13	2	2	0	2	0
22	MF	(Scotland) SCO	Richard Hughes	21	0	11+7	0	1	0	1+1	0
26	MF	(England) ENG	Gary O'Neil	38	1	36	1	2	0	0	0
28	MF	(England) ENG	Sean Davis	33	0	29+2	0	1	0	1	0
29	MF	(Cameroon) CMR	Roudolphe Douala	10	0	1+6	0	0+1	0	0+2	0
30	MF	(Portugal) POR	Pedro Mendes	28	2	25+1	2	2	0	0	0
34	MF	(Democratic Republic of the Congo) COD	Arnold Mvuemba	7	1	1+6	1	0	0	0	0
Forwards
8	FW	(England) ENG	Andy Cole	22	4	5+13	3	2	1	2	0
9	FW	(Bulgaria) BUL	Svetoslav Todorov	4	2	1+3	2	0	0	0	0
25	FW	(Zimbabwe) ZIM	Benjani	34	6	25+6	6	1+1	0	0+1	0
27	FW	(Nigeria) NGA	Nwankwo Kanu	38	12	32+4	10	0+2	2	0	0
32	FW	(Democratic Republic of the Congo) COD	Lomana LuaLua	24	2	8+14	2	0	0	2	0
Players transferred out during the season
6	MF	(Portugal) POR	Manuel Fernandes	12	1	7+3	0	0	0	2	1
7	MF	(England) ENG	David Thompson	15	0	5+7	0	0+1	0	1+1	0
17	MF	(Serbia) SRB	Ognjen Koroman	3	0	0+1	0	0	0	1+1	0
33	GK	(Republic of Ireland) IRL	Dean Kiely	1	0	0	0	0	0	1	0

Last updated: 15 May 2011
Source: Competitions

== Transfers ==
=== In ===
- (England) Glen Johnson - (England) Chelsea, season loan, 28 June
- (England) David Thompson - (England) Wigan Athletic, free, 29 July
- (England) Sol Campbell - (England) Arsenal, free, 8 August
- (England) David James - (England) Manchester City, estimated £1,200,000, 11 August
- (Nigeria) Nwankwo Kanu - (England) West Bromwich Albion, free, 17 August
- (Serbia) Ognjen Koroman - (Russia) Terek Grozny, loan, 22 August
- (England) Andy Cole - (England) Manchester City, £500,000, rising to £1,000,000, 31 August
- (Cameroon) Roudolphe Douala - (Portugal) Sporting CP, season loan, 31 August
- (Portugal) Manuel Fernandes - (Portugal) Benfica, loan, 31 August
- (Croatia) Niko Kranjčar - (Croatia) Hajduk Split, undisclosed, 31 August
- (Mali) Djimi Traoré - (England) Charlton Athletic, undisclosed, 11 January
- (Democratic Republic of the Congo) Arnold Mvuemba - (France) Rennes, season loan, 11 January
- (Cameroon) Lauren - (England) Arsenal, undisclosed, 18 January

=== Out ===
- (Netherlands) Sander Westerveld - released, 11 May (later joined (Spain) Almería)
- (France) Grégory Vignal - (France) Lens, free, 24 May
- (France) Vincent Péricard - released (later joined (England) Stoke City), 19 June
- (Denmark) Brian Priske - (Belgium) Club Brugge, 25 July
- (Colombia) Jhon Viáfara - (England) Southampton, undisclosed (estimated £750,000), 4 August
- (Bulgaria) Svetoslav Todorov - (England) Wigan Athletic, season loan, 31 August
- (Republic of Ireland) Dean Kiely - (England) Luton Town, month loan, 23 November
- (Republic of Ireland) Dean Kiely - (England) West Bromwich Albion, undisclosed, 30 January
- (England) David Thompson - (England) Bolton Wanderers, nominal fee, 31 January
- (Portugal) Manuel Fernandes - (Portugal) Benfica, loan ended
- (England) Andy Griffin - (England) Stoke City, loan, September
- (Slovenia) Aleksandar Rodić (Note: Rodić was born in Bosanska Dubica, SFR Yugoslavia (now Bosnia and Herzegovina), but also qualified to represent Slovenia internationally and made his international debut for Slovenia in 2005.) - released (later joined (Bulgaria) Litex Lovech)
- (Senegal) Aliou Cissé - released (later joined (France) Sedan)
- (Zambia) Collins Mbesuma - (Portugal) Marítimo, season loan, July
- (Poland) Emmanuel Olisadebe (Note: Olisadebe was born in Warri, Nigeria. but gained Polish citizenship and made his international debut for Poland in 2000.) - contract terminated
- (Italy) Andrea Guatelli - released
- (England) Gary Silk - released (later joined (England) Notts County)
- (Croatia) Ivica Mornar - contract terminated, September
- (England) James Keene - (Sweden) IF Elfsborg
