= Glen Johnson =

English footballer (born 1984)

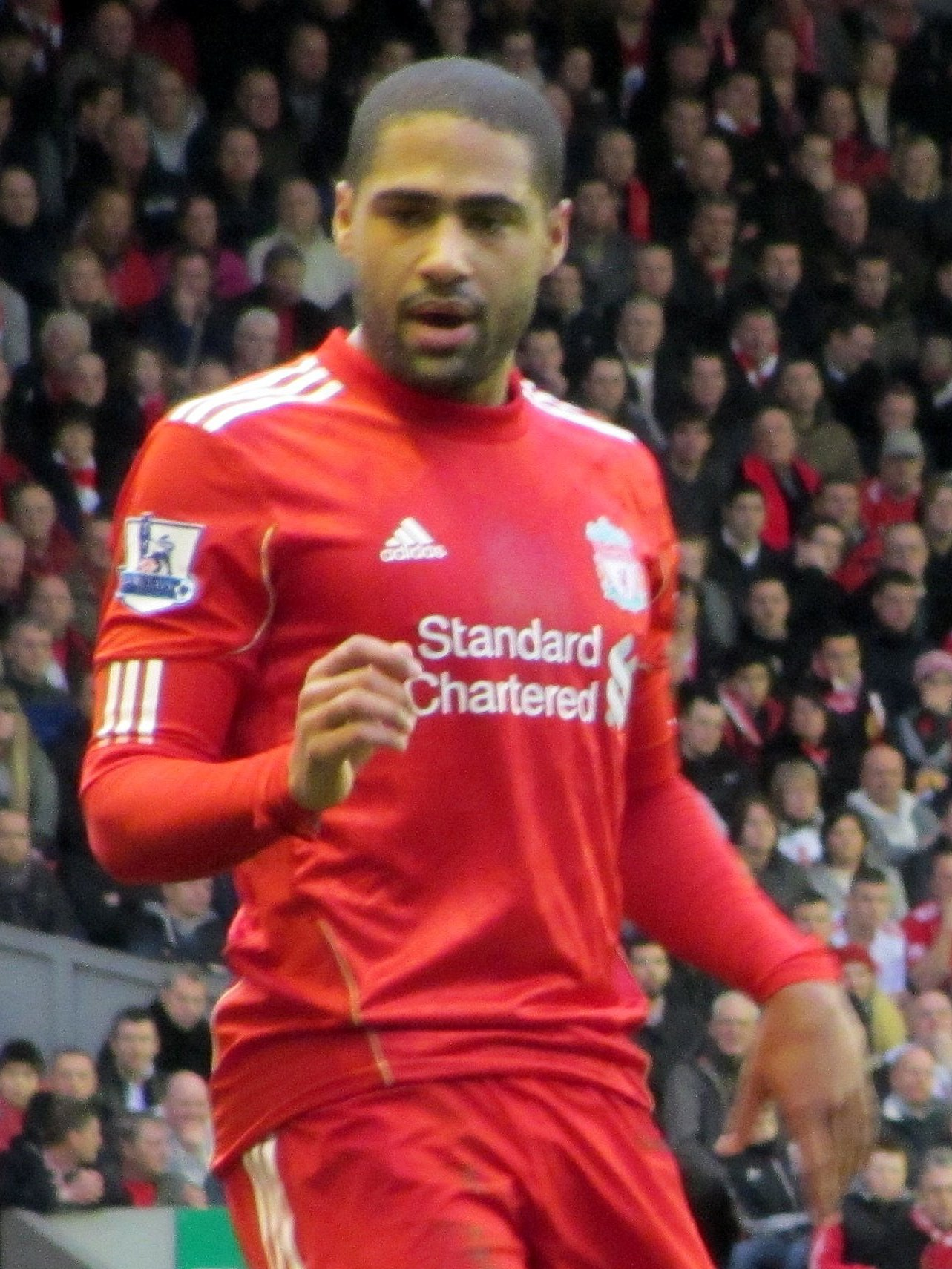
- Johnson playing for Liverpool in 2011

Personal information
- Full name: Glen McLeod Cooper Johnson
- Birth name: Glen McLeod Cooper Stephens
- Date of birth: 23 August 1984 (age 42)
- Place of birth: Greenwich, London, England
- Height: 6 ft 0 in (1.82 m)
- Position: Right back

Youth career
- 1993–2002: West Ham United

Senior career*
Years	Team	Apps	(Gls)
2002–2003	West Ham United	15	(0)
2002	→ Millwall (loan)	8	(0)
2003–2007	Chelsea	42	(3)
2006–2007	→ Portsmouth (loan)	26	(0)
2007–2009	Portsmouth	58	(4)
2009–2015	Liverpool	160	(8)
2015–2018	Stoke City	57	(0)
Total		366	(15)

International career
1999–2000	England U16	7	(2)
2000–2001	England U17	19	(1)
2001–2002	England U19	10	(0)
2002	England U20	1	(0)
2003–2006	England U21	14	(0)
2003–2014	England	54	(1)
- * Club domestic league appearances and goals

Glen McLeod Cooper Johnson (né Stephens; born 23 August 1984) is an English former professional footballer who played as a right back.

Johnson began his career at West Ham United, spending time on loan at Millwall, and was signed by Chelsea for a £6 million fee after West Ham's relegation in 2003. He helped Chelsea win the 2004–05 Premier League title and the 2005 League Cup final. In June 2006, Johnson joined Portsmouth on loan for the 2006–07 season. Following a successful season on loan at Fratton Park, Johnson joined Portsmouth permanently for a fee of around £4 million.

Johnson played 99 times for Portsmouth and played in the 2008 FA Cup final as Portsmouth beat Cardiff City 1–0. Johnson moved to Liverpool in the summer of 2009 for a £17.5 million fee. Johnson spent six seasons at Anfield making 200 appearances which included victory in the 2012 League Cup final. He joined Stoke City in July 2015 on a free transfer, and made 64 appearances over three seasons before retiring.

Johnson was capped 54 times by the England national team from 2003 to 2014. He was selected in England's squads for the 2010 and 2014 FIFA World Cups and UEFA Euro 2012.

== Early life ==
Known as Glen Stephens at the time of his birth, he took his mother's surname following the separation of his parents. His parents Wendy Johnson and John Stephens named him after former England midfielder Glenn Hoddle. He was born in Greenwich, London, and grew up in Dartford, Kent, where he attended Temple Hill Primary School and then Leigh CTC School. He was raised by his mother and grew up with his younger brother and older half-sister.

At one stage of his childhood, he lived in a hostel as his mother had nowhere to live. Johnson credits his mother with helping him develop a football career, saying, "She had a tough time, bringing up three kids as a single parent with no help apart from the goodwill of close friends, and there were times when we had nowhere to stay. At one point we were homeless and staying in a hostel, but once mum got herself on her feet after a few hard years, and passed her driving test so she could take me to football every week, that gave us a fresh start."

== Club career ==
=== West Ham United ===
Johnson was a product of the West Ham United youth system managed by Tony Carr from the age of nine, becoming a 15-year-old first year scholar in 2000. He signed a three-year professional contract with the club on 1 August 2001, close to his 17th birthday. In the 2001–02 season, he made regular appearances for West Ham reserves, but was unable to break into the first team. He eventually signed an initial four-week loan deal with local rivals Millwall on 17 October 2002, making his First Division debut in an away loss against Norwich City on 19 October. His loan was twice extended by a month, before he was recalled early to Upton Park after having spent seven weeks at The Den, his final appearance in a Millwall shirt coming in another away defeat to Crystal Palace on 7 November.

Johnson's Premier League and West Ham debut came on 22 January 2003 in another away defeat to a London club, this time against Charlton Athletic, when he came on for midfielder Édouard Cissé. He made 15 league appearances and one FA Cup appearance in 2002–03, becoming a more significant member of the West Ham team as the year went on. He even signed a new four-year deal to remain in east London on 18 March 2003, appearing keen to help keep the club in the top flight. However, his last outing in a Hammers shirt was to come on the final day of the season, 11 May 2003, in a 2–2 draw away at Birmingham City which condemned the Hammers to relegation to the First Division.

=== Chelsea ===
Two months after West Ham United's relegation, Johnson joined London rivals Chelsea, signing on 15 July for a fee of £6 million. The first purchase under the ownership of Roman Abramovich, he made his debut on 13 August in an away win against Žilina in the 2003–04 UEFA Champions League, and his first Chelsea goal came in the corresponding home leg two weeks later. His league debut came on 17 August in an Anfield win against Liverpool, but he had to wait until 9 November for his first league goal, netting the opener of a 5–0 victory over Newcastle United. He made 19 league appearances in 2003–04 as Chelsea finished as runners-up.

In Chelsea's FA Cup fifth-round match against Newcastle United in the following season, goalkeeper Carlo Cudicini was sent off late in the match, and with no substitutions remaining, Johnson went in goal. Although he did not concede, Newcastle were already 1–0 up and went through at the expense of Chelsea. He picked up a winner's medal when he came on as a second-half substitute for Chelsea in the 2005 League Cup final, a match which Chelsea won 3–2 against Liverpool after extra time. He also made 16 appearances, enough for a medal, as they won the Premier League title in this season, but he was to miss out on a medal for their success in the next season after managing only four appearances in the league.

Johnson joined Portsmouth on a season-long loan in June 2006. On his return to Chelsea, Johnson started the 2007 FA Community Shield, which Chelsea lost to Manchester United, and the opening Premier League match of the season at home to Birmingham City.

=== Portsmouth ===
On 31 August 2007, Johnson signed for Portsmouth on a four-year contract for a fee believed to be £4 million. He was handed a start in the first match after his transfer, a 3–1 defeat at Arsenal, and became the club's regular right back. On 20 October, Johnson scored his first goal in over three years, against Wigan Athletic in a 2–0 win, after dribbling from the halfway line. He helped reach the 2008 FA Cup final against Cardiff City where Johnson played in a 1–0 victory. Shortly after Johnson's cup success, he and Portsmouth substitute goalkeeper Jamie Ashdown had their winner's medals stolen from their hotel rooms. After the medals were not returned, the FA remade medals for Johnson and Ashdown.

On 22 November 2008, Johnson scored a 30-yard screamer with his left foot against Hull City, a goal which won Match of the Day's Goal of the Month award for November, and later won the Goal of the Season award. Johnson seemed to have ended speculation that he would move to Liverpool for a rumoured amount of £9 million by signing a four-and-a-half-year contract with Portsmouth on 9 January 2009, although speculation once again suggested that Johnson could make a big money move to Liverpool in the near future; this was reaffirmed in late April 2009 On 22 April 2009, at the age of 24, Johnson was the youngest member of The Times "Top 50 Portsmouth players" list. Johnson was included in the PFA Team of the Year for 2008–09 despite Portsmouth finishing in the bottom-half of the Premier League, just seven points above the relegation zone.

=== Liverpool ===
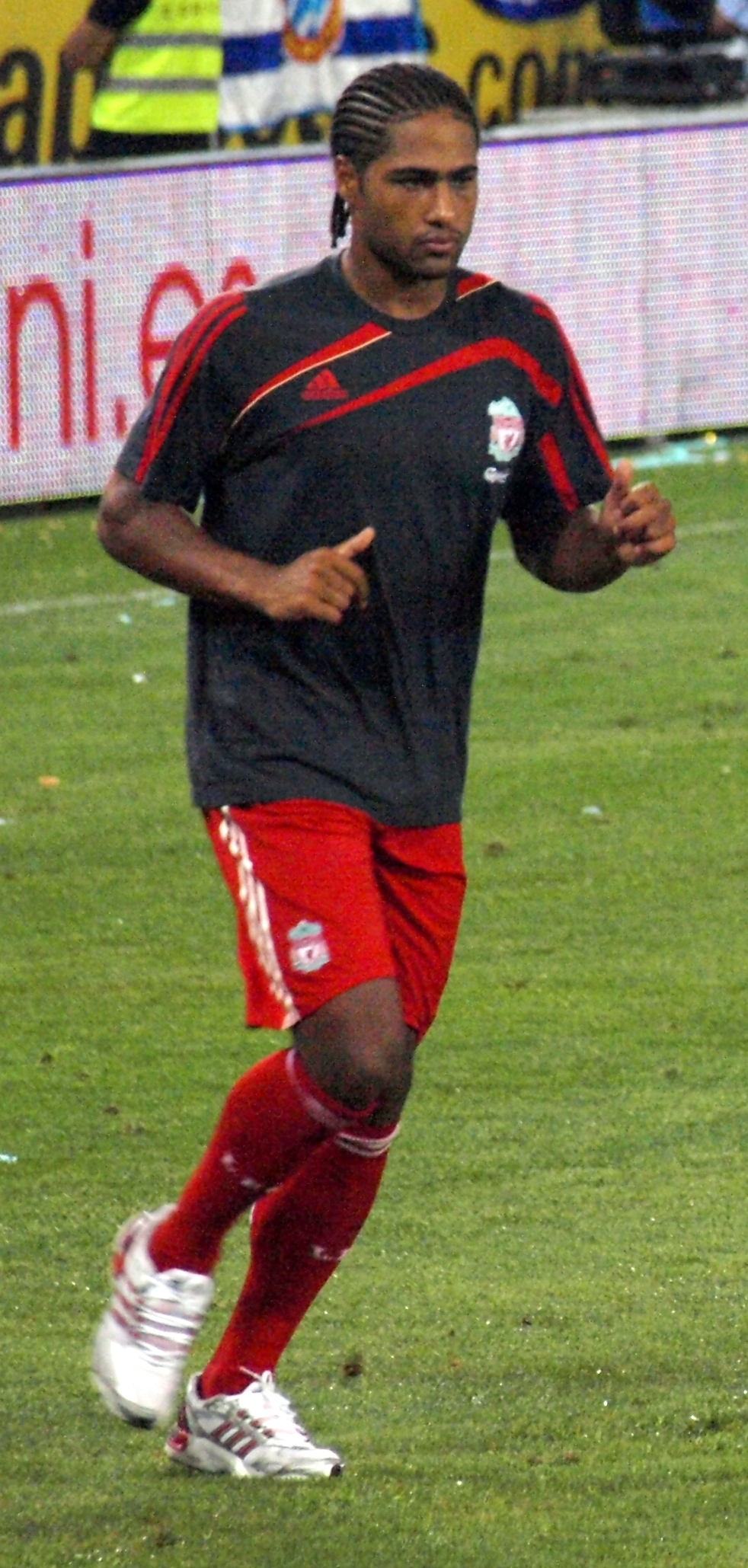
Johnson warming up for Liverpool in 2009

A Portsmouth representative confirmed on 13 June 2009 that a "sizeable bid" had been received for Johnson, with Chelsea, Liverpool and Manchester City being mooted as possible suitors. On 16 June 2009, Portsmouth agreed a bid believed to be £18.5 million from Liverpool. However, two days later Portsmouth confirmed they had also accepted a bid from Chelsea and it was up to the player as to who he wanted to join. Liverpool were believed to have tabled the £10 million bid on the basis that they were still owed £7 million by Portsmouth from the purchase of Peter Crouch in the summer of 2008, with Liverpool willing to reduce the fee owed on signing Johnson. On 22 June 2009, Liverpool announced the transfer and on 26 June 2009, Johnson signed a four-year contract. Johnson made his Premier League debut on 16 August 2009 in a 2–1 defeat by Tottenham Hotspur.

On his home league debut for Liverpool on 19 August 2009, Johnson put in a man-of-the-match performance against Stoke City scoring his first goal for the club while also getting an assist in a match where he caused countless problems for the opposition defence. On 29 August, Johnson scored his second goal for Liverpool in a 3–2 win against Bolton Wanderers. On 30 December 2009, Johnson sustained a tear of the medial collateral ligament in his right knee during a league fixture against Aston Villa, which then-Liverpool manager Rafael Benítez said would keep him out of action for at least a month. On his return from injury in March, Johnson returned to form, scoring his third goal for the club against Sunderland at Anfield. Johnson went on to make eight more appearances for the rest of the season, including helping Liverpool reach the semi-finals of the UEFA Europa League where they were knocked out by Atlético Madrid. Johnson played 35 times and scored three goals in his debut season with the Reds.

Johnson made a slow start to 2010–11 and in November 2010, Johnson received criticism from manager Roy Hodgson, who felt his performances during that time had not been of international standard. Johnson held clear-the-air talks with Hodgson and the pair played down their dispute. Johnson scored his first goal of the 2010–11 Premier League on 20 November 2010 against West Ham United at Anfield in a 3–0 win, after returning from being out with a groin strain. On 5 January 2011, Johnson started and played the full 90 minutes against Blackburn Rovers at Ewood Park in a rather disappointing 3–1 defeat. Johnson then suffered an injury against West Bromwich Albion at The Hawthorns, but recovered before the end of the season to play in the final four matches of the season, including a 5–2 win over Fulham at Craven Cottage. Johnson made 35 appearances for Liverpool in 2010–11 as the team finished in 6th position.

On 6 July 2011, Johnson signed a contract extension at Liverpool, the length of which was not disclosed by the club. On 20 November 2011, Johnson scored a solo goal against his former club, Chelsea, at Stamford Bridge after being set up by Charlie Adam. This proved to be the decisive goal, with Liverpool winning 2–1. On 26 February 2012, he helped Liverpool to win their first trophy since 2006 as they won the 2012 League Cup final against Cardiff City, playing the full match, hitting the crossbar in the opening minutes and scoring his penalty in the penalty shoot-out, winning his first trophy for Liverpool. Johnson played 29 times in 2011–12 under the management of Kenny Dalglish as Liverpool finished in 8th position but qualified for Europe due to their League Cup win.

On 9 December 2012, Johnson scored Liverpool's first goal in a 3–2 win over his old club West Ham. He played 43 matches in 2012–13 as Liverpool finished seventh and reached the round of 32 in the UEFA Europa League, losing out to Zenit Saint Petersburg. Johnson played 30 times for Liverpool in 2013–14 as the team narrowly missed out on the Premier League title. On 29 November 2014 Johnson scored the only goal for Liverpool in a 1–0 victory over Stoke City. On 24 May 2015, Johnson announced that he would leave Liverpool at the end of the season. On 10 June, Johnson was released by the club.

=== Stoke City ===
Johnson joined Stoke City on 12 July 2015, signing a two-year contract. He made his debut for Stoke on 9 August 2015 in a 1–0 defeat against his former club Liverpool. Johnson was Mark Hughes's first-choice right back in 2015–16 until he suffered a season ending knee injury against AFC Bournemouth on 13 February 2016. Johnson played 29 times for Stoke prior to suffering his injury and the team went on to finish in ninth position. Towards the end of the campaign Stoke suffered from a loss of form and Hughes cited Johnson's absence as one of the main reasons. Johnson signed a one-year contract extension with Stoke in April 2017. Johnson made 25 appearances in 2016–17, as Stoke finished in 13th position.

Johnson struggled for playing time in 2017–18, making just ten appearances, as Stoke suffered relegation to the EFL Championship. He was released by Stoke at the end of the season.

On 21 January 2019, Johnson announced his retirement.

== International career ==
=== Early career and under-21s ===
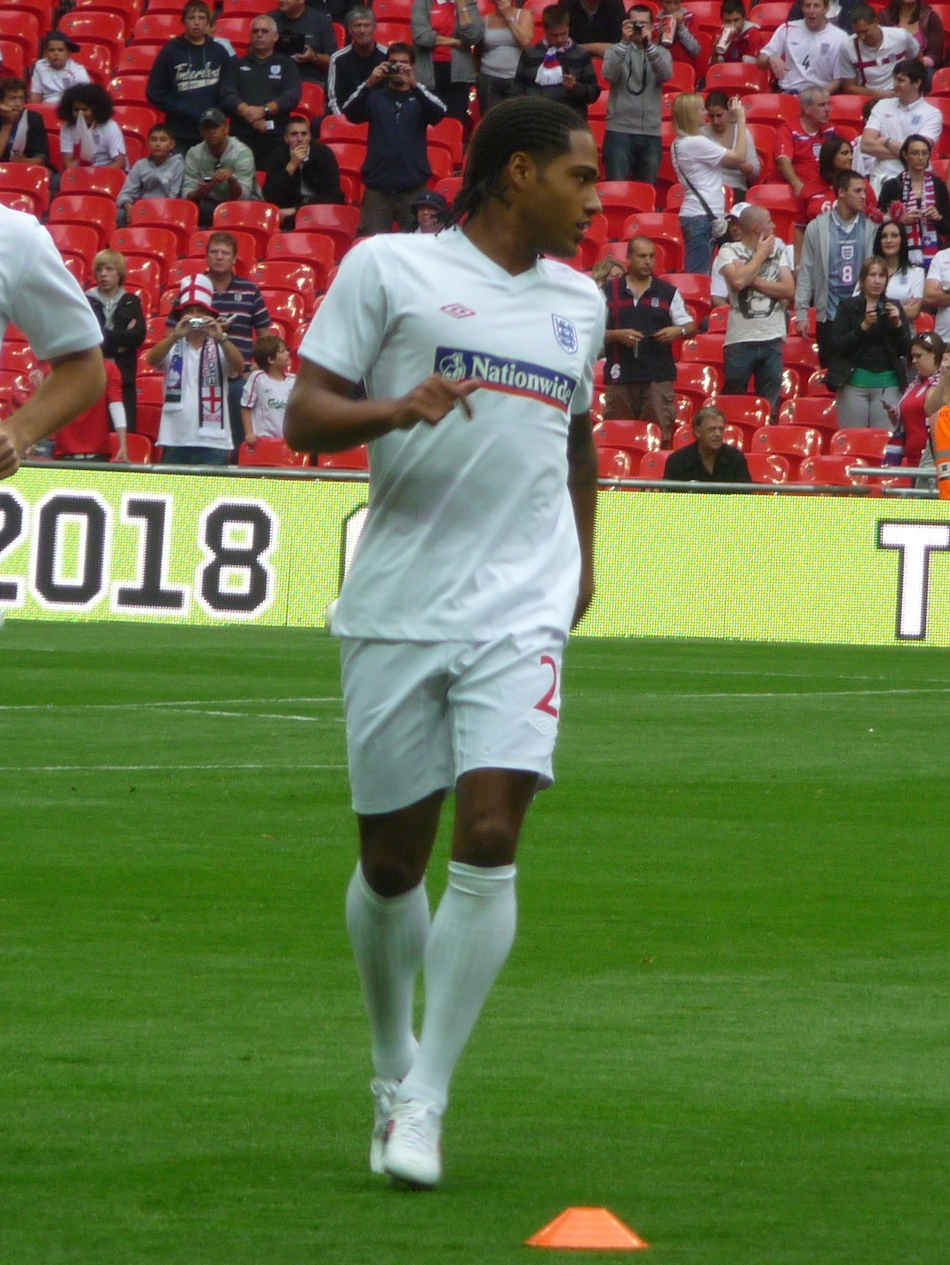
Johnson warming up for England in 2009

During his time with the England under-21s, Johnson was handed his full England debut on 18 November 2003 against Denmark, coming on as a substitute for the injured Gary Neville after 16 minutes.

Following a poor performance in England's friendly in Denmark in August 2005, he lost his position as Neville's understudy in the squad to Luke Young, who played in both the subsequent World Cup qualifiers. Johnson did not make any further England appearances under Sven-Göran Eriksson or his successor Steve McClaren, but was named in Fabio Capello's first squad in January 2008.

In 2010 Johnson played in the 2–0 victory over Andorra, and made four assists in the subsequent 6–0 victory against the same team for which he was named man of the match. Johnson scored his first goal for England in a friendly match against Mexico on 24 May 2010 at Wembley Stadium, which ended 3–1 to England.

=== Euro 2012 ===
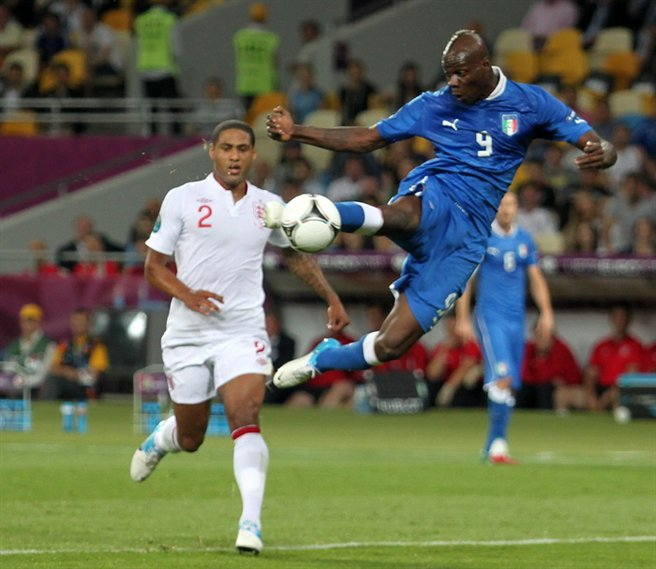
Johnson (left) playing for England at UEFA Euro 2012

In February 2011, Johnson began England's new calendar year by assisting Ashley Young's winning goal in a 2–1 victory over Denmark in Copenhagen.

On 16 May 2012, Johnson was named in new England manager Roy Hodgson's UEFA Euro 2012 squad. After missing England's 1–0 friendly win against Norway through injury, he played in England's second warm-up match, a 1–0 win against Belgium at Wembley Stadium. He featured in all three of England's group matches at the tournament, helping England to win their group with a draw against France, and wins against Sweden and Ukraine. On 24 June 2012, he started for England in their quarter-final fixture with Italy, in which they were eliminated on penalties.

=== 2014 World Cup ===
On 12 May, Johnson was named in the 23-man England squad for the 2014 FIFA World Cup. During England's group stage match against Uruguay, Johnson made a run down the right wing, received a pass from Daniel Sturridge and speared a cross into the penalty area to Wayne Rooney who scored, although Uruguay went on to win 2–1.

== Personal life ==
Born in England, Johnson is of Jamaican descent. In 2007, Johnson set up the Glen Johnson Soccer School alongside Sam Taylor, a former player of West Ham United. The football school is based in Dartford, Kent, and its primary focus is training and development within local schools and one of his students is currently at West Ham United.

In January 2007, it was reported that Johnson and his former Millwall teammate Ben May were caught at a B&Q store in Dartford, Kent, attempting to steal bathroom fittings. They both received £80 fines. Johnson described the incident as "comical" because it was a misunderstanding — "Ben was doing up his bathroom so we went to B&Q and found one of those sets where you get everything in one box. But he wanted a seat with a slow-close lid, so we took out the seat and put in another one. What we didn't know was that the new seat was £2.35 more expensive. We went through the till, paid for it and then the security guard stopped us and said he had been watching on CCTV. We just burst out laughing. Where's Jeremy Beadle then? But he said, 'No, this is serious, the police are on their way.' The police turned up and they were laughing. I said to the security guard, 'Can we not just pay the £2.35?'" He said, 'No, this is a serious offence.' So the police gave us two options: go to court and fight it out, or pay an on-the-spot fine. We couldn't be bothered going to court so we paid the fine but doing that made us look guilty".

In 2007, Glen Johnson founded Johnsons Real Estate with his brother, Lewis Johnson. The Johnson Real Estate web site states 'Glen was the founder of Johnsons Real Estate in 2007 and has spearheaded the team ever since.' He is the Chief Executive Officer of Johnsons Real Estate.

In December 2013, Johnson was banned from driving for six months after he was caught speeding in North Wales; he later lost his appeal against his conviction.

== Career statistics ==
=== Club ===
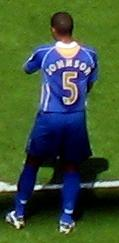
Johnson playing for Portsmouth in 2007

Appearances and goals by club, season and competition
Club	Season	League			FA Cup		League Cup		Europe		Other		Total	
Club	Season	Division	Apps	Goals	Apps	Goals	Apps	Goals	Apps	Goals	Apps	Goals	Apps	Goals
West Ham United	2002–03	Premier League	15	0	1	0	0	0	—		—		16	0
Millwall (loan)	2002–03	First Division	8	0	—		—		—		—		8	0
Chelsea	2003–04	Premier League	19	3	1	0	3	0	9 (Note: Appearances in UEFA Champions League)	1	—		32	4
Chelsea	2004–05	Premier League	17	0	3	0	3	0	6	0	—		29	0
Chelsea	2005–06	Premier League	4	0	4	0	0	0	0	0	0	0	8	0
Chelsea	2007–08	Premier League	2	0	—		—		—		1 (Note: Appearance in FA Community Shield)	0	3	0
Chelsea	Total		42	3	8	0	6	0	15	1	1	0	72	4
Portsmouth (loan)	2006–07	Premier League	26	0	2	0	—		—		—		28	0
Portsmouth	2007–08	Premier League	29	1	6	0	1	0	—		—		36	1
Portsmouth	2008–09	Premier League	29	3	1	0	1	0	4 (Note: Appearances in UEFA Cup)	0	1	0	36	3
Portsmouth	Total		84	4	9	0	2	0	4	0	1	0	100	4
Liverpool	2009–10	Premier League	25	3	0	0	1	0	9 (Note: Three appearances in UEFA Champions League, six in UEFA Europa League)	0	—		35	3
Liverpool	2010–11	Premier League	28	2	0	0	0	0	7 (Note: Appearances in UEFA Europa League)	0	—		35	2
Liverpool	2011–12	Premier League	23	1	3	0	3	0	—		—		29	1
Liverpool	2012–13	Premier League	36	1	0	0	0	0	7	1	—		43	2
Liverpool	2013–14	Premier League	29	0	0	0	1	0	—		—		30	0
Liverpool	2014–15	Premier League	19	1	4	0	2	0	3	0	—		28	1
Liverpool	Total		160	8	7	0	7	0	26	1	—		200	9
Stoke City	2015–16	Premier League	25	0	1	0	3	0	—		—		29	0
Stoke City	2016–17	Premier League	23	0	1	0	1	0	—		—		25	0
Stoke City	2017–18	Premier League	9	0	0	0	1	0	—		—		10	0
Stoke City	Total		57	0	2	0	5	0	—		—		64	0
Career total			366	15	27	0	20	0	45	2	2	0	460	17

=== International ===
Appearances and goals by national team and year
National team	Year	Apps	Goals
England	2003	1	0
England	2004	1	0
England	2005	3	0
England	2008	5	0
England	2009	10	0
England	2010	10	1
England	2011	5	0
England	2012	9	0
England	2013	5	0
England	2014	5	0
Total		54	1

Scores and results list England's goal tally first, score column indicates score after each Johnson goal.

List of international goals scored by Glen Johnson
No.	Date	Venue	Opponent	Score	Result	Competition	Ref.
1	24 May 2010	Wembley Stadium, London, England	Mexico	3–1	3–1	Friendly	

== Honours ==
Chelsea

- Premier League: 2004–05
- Football League Cup: 2004–05

Portsmouth

- FA Cup: 2007–08

Liverpool

- Football League Cup: 2011–12
- FA Cup runner-up: 2011–12

Individual

- PFA Team of the Year: 2008–09 Premier League
- Portsmouth Player of the Season: 2008–09
- BBC Goal of the Season: 2008–09
