= 1998–99 Liverpool F.C. season =

English football club season

Liverpool
1998–99 season
- Chairman: David Moores
- Manager: Roy Evans and Gérard Houllier (joint managers until November); Gérard Houllier (from November)
- Stadium: Anfield
- Premier League: 7th
- FA Cup: Fourth round
- League Cup: Fourth round
- UEFA Cup: Third round
- Top goalscorer: League: Michael Owen (18); All: Michael Owen (23)
Home colours	Away colours	Third colours

The 1998–99 Liverpool F.C. season was the 107th season in the club's existence, and their 37th consecutive year in the top-flight of English football. In addition to the Premier League, the club also competed in the FA Cup, League Cup, and the UEFA Cup.

This season covered the period of 1 July 1998 to 30 June 1999.

== Season overview ==
The appointment of former France national team head coach Gérard Houllier as joint manager alongside Roy Evans was seen as Liverpool's best chance of making a title challenge, but Evans did not enjoy the partnership and resigned in November to leave Houllier in sole charge.

Despite Michael Owen's brilliant form, Liverpool were unable to mount anything like a title challenge and seemed to be a side in transition following the appointment of their new head coach and adapting to a new style, which saw new signing Rigobert Song arrive and the likes of Jason McAteer and Rob Jones leave, along with the club's longest serving player Steve Harkness, who joined Benfica on 7 March 1999 after almost ten years at Anfield.

By January, the side was reshuffled but the failure of the club to retain the services of Steve McManaman, transferred to Real Madrid at the end of the season in a deal labelled as the Bosman scandal of the season, hurt the club financially. Performance wise, their seventh-place finish was not enough to attain even a UEFA Cup place, as well as being the club's lowest finish in five years.

The season had not started poorly, with a 2–1 win at Southampton followed by a 0–0 draw at home to the previous season's double winners Arsenal and an impressive 4–1 away win over Newcastle United just days after the Tynesiders had sacked former Liverpool boss Kenny Dalglish. September began with a 2–0 win over Coventry City which saw the Reds top the table after four matches, level on points with Aston Villa, while title favourites Arsenal and Manchester United were fifth and ninth respectively.

However, Liverpool's lead of the Premier League was lost in their fifth match after they lost 2–1 at West Ham United. They travelled to Old Trafford for an encounter with fierce rivals Manchester United on 24 September, but lost 2–0. They were now fourth in the league, while United were third, unfancied Derby County were second and Aston Villa now led the league.

15 September saw the beginning of the club's UEFA Cup campaign, where they defeated Slovak side Košice 3–0 away in Košice. A comprehensive 5–0 win in the second leg booked Liverpool's place in the next round.

October was a mixed month for the Reds, who crushed Nottingham Forest 5–1 in the Premier League at Anfield but were held to draws by Chelsea and Everton and ended the month with a 1–0 defeat at Leicester City which saw them still restricted to fourth place. However, they were now six points behind leaders Aston Villa – who had a game in hand – and more than a quarter of the league season had now passed. Manchester United were now one point off the top, while Arsenal had re-emerged as contenders for the title they had won the previous season, now occupying third place. Derby County's challenge had fallen away as they slipped to mid-table.

There was positive news on the European scene that late autumn as they edged past Valencia on away goals in the UEFA Cup second round.

Liverpool's League Cup quest began well with a 3–1 home win over Division Two leaders Fulham in the third round, but ended in the next round with a 3–1 home defeat to a Tottenham Hotspur side who were recovering well from their dismal start to the season since the appointment of George Graham as manager. The first half of November was a disaster for the Reds, who lost at home to both Derby County and Leeds United. However, the month ended on a higher note as wins over Aston Villa and Blackburn Rovers lifted them back up to eighth place.

Liverpool's dreams of European glory were ended on 8 December 1998 when they suffered a hefty defeat to Celta Vigo in the UEFA Cup third round. The Reds had stuttered in the league early in the month and a 1–0 defeat at Wimbledon on 13 December saw them occupy 12th place in the league. However, three straight wins saw them rise to seventh by the end of the year.

By the dawn of the new year, Liverpool's last hope of silverware was in the FA Cup. They had an easy start in the competition, travelling to Vale Park for a third round tie with Division One strugglers Port Vale, coming away 3–0 winners. However, their hopes of glory ended in the fourth round when they surrendered a 1–0 lead in the dying minutes to lose 2–1 to Manchester United at Old Trafford. Their dismal league form that month saw them draw 0–0 at Arsenal and lose 2–1 at Coventry City, though they had some wry consolation in the form of a 7–1 hammering of strugglers Southampton at Anfield, in a match that saw Robbie Fowler score his 100th Premier League goal. They were now sixth in the league, now being led by Chelsea, who were eight points ahead of them with a game in hand.

Spring brought a similar pattern of results, and by 21 April, they had slid down to tenth place in the league with even their UEFA Cup qualification hopes looking slim. They needed a good run of results to even finish eighth, the lowest position they had finished in since their current spell as a top flight club began in 1962.

Wins over Blackburn and Tottenham kept the Reds in contention for European qualification with three matches to play, but a draw at home to Manchester United and a defeat at Sheffield Wednesday meant a 3–0 home win over Wimbledon on the final day of the season was not enough for anything higher than seventh place, meaning the 1999–2000 season would be Liverpool's first season in five years without European football.

== Players ==
=== First-team squad ===
Squad at end of season

Note: Flags indicate national team as defined under FIFA eligibility rules; some limited exceptions apply. Players may hold more than one non-FIFA nationality.

No.	Pos.	Nation	Player
1	GK	ENG	David James
2	DF	ENG	Rob Jones
3	DF	NOR	Bjørn Tore Kvarme
4	DF	CMR	Rigobert Song
5	DF	IRL	Steve Staunton
6	DF	IRL	Phil Babb (Note: Babb was born in Lambeth, England, but also qualified to represent the Republic of Ireland internationally and made his international debut for the Republic of Ireland in 1994.)
7	MF	ENG	Steve McManaman
8	MF	NOR	Øyvind Leonhardsen
9	FW	ENG	Robbie Fowler
10	FW	ENG	Michael Owen
11	MF	ENG	Jamie Redknapp
13	FW	GER	Karl-Heinz Riedle
14	MF	NOR	Vegard Heggem
15	MF	CZE	Patrik Berger
16	FW	RSA	Sean Dundee (Note: Dundee was born in Durban, South Africa, but also holds German nationality and would make his international debut for the Germany B team in March 2000.)

No.	Pos.	Nation	Player
17	MF	ENG	Paul Ince
18	MF	FRA	Jean-Michel Ferri
19	GK	USA	Brad Friedel
20	DF	NOR	Stig Inge Bjørnebye
21	DF	ENG	Dominic Matteo (Note: Matteo was born in Dumfries, Scotland, but was raised in England from the age of four and represented them at U-21 and B level before making his international debut for Scotland in November 2000.)
22	GK	ENG	Tony Warner (Note: Warner was born in Liverpool, England, but also qualified to represent Trinidad and Tobago internationally and would make his international debut for Trinidad and Tobago in February 2006.)
23	DF	ENG	Jamie Carragher
24	MF	ENG	Danny Murphy
25	MF	ENG	David Thompson
26	GK	DEN	Jorgen Nielsen
27	MF	ISL	Haukur Ingi Guðnason
28	MF	ENG	Steven Gerrard
29	DF	ENG	Stephen Wright
30	DF	MLI	Djimi Traoré (Note: Traoré was born in Saint-Ouen, France, but also qualified to represent Mali internationally and would make his international debut for Mali in 2004.)

=== Left club during season ===
Note: Flags indicate national team as defined under FIFA eligibility rules; some limited exceptions apply. Players may hold more than one non-FIFA nationality.

No.	Pos.	Nation	Player
4	DF	IRL	Jason McAteer (Note: McAteer was born in Tranmere, England, but also qualified to represent the Republic of Ireland internationally and made his international debut for the Republic of Ireland in March 1994.) (to Blackburn Rovers)
12	DF	ENG	Steve Harkness (to Benfica)

No.	Pos.	Nation	Player
—	MF	WAL	Danny Williams (to Wrexham)

=== Reserves ===
Note: Flags indicate national team as defined under FIFA eligibility rules; some limited exceptions apply. Players may hold more than one non-FIFA nationality.

No. / Pos. / Nation / Player; — / MF / ENG / Jamie Cassidy	No. / Pos. / Nation / Player; — / DF / WAL / Gareth Roberts

== Pre-season and friendlies ==
Date	Opponents	H / A	Result F–A	Scorers
24 July 1998	Crewe Alexandra	A	3–1	Murphy 64', Matteo 65' Kvarme 67'
27 July 1998	Randers Freja	A	1–1	Riedle 79'
29 July 1998	Rosenborg	A	0–2	
31 July 1998	St Patrick's Athletic	N	3–2	Berger 12', Riedle 29', Murphy 37'
1 August 1998	Leeds United	N	2–0	Berger 56', Owen 57'
4 August 1998	Inter Milan	H	2–1	Ince 29', Harkness 76'
8 August 1998	Celtic	A	1–0	Leonhardsen 36'
17 March 1999	Boulogne	A	1–2	Berger 13'
18 May 1999	Sunderland	A	3–2	Fowler 39' (pen.), Redknapp 66', Ince 77'

== Competitions ==
=== Premier League ===
==== League table ====
Pos	Team	Pld	W	D	L	GF	GA	GD	Pts	Qualification or relegation
5	West Ham United	38	16	9	13	46	53	−7	57	Qualification for the Intertoto Cup third round
6	Aston Villa	38	15	10	13	51	46	+5	55	
7	Liverpool	38	15	9	14	68	49	+19	54	
8	Derby County	38	13	13	12	40	45	−5	52	
9	Middlesbrough	38	12	15	11	48	54	−6	51	

Source: Premier League
Rules for classification: 1) points; 2) goal difference; 3) number of goals scored.

==== Results summary ====
Overall								Home						Away					
Pld	W	D	L	GF	GA	GD	Pts	W	D	L	GF	GA	GD	W	D	L	GF	GA	GD
38	15	9	14	68	49	+19	54	10	5	4	44	24	+20	5	4	10	24	25	−1

Source: 1998-99 FA Premier League table

==== Results by round ====
Round	1	2	3	4	5	6	7	8	9	10	11	12	13	14	15	16	17	18	19	20	21	22	23	24	25	26	27	28	29	30	31	32	33	34	35	36	37	38
Ground	A	H	A	H	A	H	A	H	A	H	A	H	H	A	H	A	A	H	A	H	A	H	A	H	A	H	A	A	H	A	A	H	H	A	H	H	A	H
Result	W	D	W	W	L	D	L	D	D	W	L	L	L	W	W	L	L	W	W	W	D	W	L	W	L	D	L	L	W	D	D	L	L	W	W	D	L	W
Position	2	4	1	1	2	3	4	5	7	3	4	8	11	9	8	9	12	9	9	7	7	6	6	5	5	6	7	9	8	8	9	9	10	9	8	7	8	7

Source: 11v11.com: 1998-99 Liverpool results
A = Away; H = Home; W = Win; D = Draw; L = Loss

==== Matches ====
16 August 1998 1	Southampton	1–2	Liverpool	Southampton, Hampshire
	Østenstad 36'	Report	Riedle 38'; Owen 72'	Stadium: The Dell; Attendance: 15,202

22 August 1998 2	Liverpool	0–0	Arsenal	Liverpool, Merseyside
		Report		Stadium: Anfield; Attendance: 44,429; Referee: David Elleray

30 August 1998 3	Newcastle United	1–4	Liverpool	Newcastle-upon-Tyne, Tyne and Wear
	Guivarc'h 28'	Report	Owen 17', 18', 32'; Berger 45'	Stadium: St. James' Park; Attendance: 36,740; Referee: Graham Barber

9 September 1998 4	Liverpool	2–0	Coventry City	Liverpool, Merseyside
	Berger 26'; Redknapp 48'	Report		Stadium: Anfield; Attendance: 41,771

12 September 1998 5	West Ham United	2–1	Liverpool	Upton Park, London
	Hartson 4'; Berkovic 51'	Report	Riedle 88'	Stadium: Boleyn Ground; Attendance: 26,010

19 September 1998 6	Liverpool	3–3	Charlton Athletic	Liverpool, Merseyside
	Fowler 33' (pen.), 82'; Berger 67'	Report	Rufus 24'; Mendonca 61'; S. Jones 83'	Stadium: Anfield; Attendance: 44,526; Referee: Paul Alcock

24 September 1998 7	Manchester United	2–0	Liverpool	Trafford, Greater Manchester
	Irwin 19' (pen.); Scholes 79'	Report		Stadium: Old Trafford; Attendance: 55,181; Referee: Stephen Lodge

4 October 1998 8	Liverpool	1–1	Chelsea	Liverpool, Merseyside
	Redknapp 83'	Report	Casiraghi 10'	Stadium: Anfield; Attendance: 44,404; Referee: Graham Poll

17 October 1998 9	Everton	0–0	Liverpool	Liverpool, Merseyside
		Report		Stadium: Goodison Park; Attendance: 40,185

24 October 1998 10	Liverpool	5–1	Nottingham Forest	Liverpool, Merseyside
	Owen 10', 38', 71' (pen.), 77'; McManaman 23'	Report	Freedman 18'	Stadium: Anfield; Attendance: 44,595; Referee: Steve Dunn

31 October 1998 11	Leicester City	1–0	Liverpool	Leicester, East Midlands
	Cottee 79'			Stadium: Filbert Street; Attendance: 21,837

7 November 1998 12	Liverpool	1–2	Derby County	Liverpool, Merseyside
	Redknapp 84'	Report	Harper 6'; Wanchope 27'	Stadium: Anfield; Attendance: 44,020; Referee: Uriah Rennie

14 November 1998 13	Liverpool	1–3	Leeds United	Liverpool, Merseyside
	Fowler 68' (pen.)	Report	Smith 79'; Hasselbaink 81', 86'	Stadium: Anfield; Attendance: 44,305

21 November 1998 14	Aston Villa	2–4	Liverpool	Birmingham, West Midlands
	Dublin 47', 63'	Report	Ince 2'; Fowler 7', 58', 66'	Stadium: Villa Park; Attendance: 39,241; Referee: Peter Jones

29 November 1998 15	Liverpool	2–0	Blackburn Rovers	Liverpool, Merseyside
	Ince 30'; Owen 33'	Report		Stadium: Anfield; Attendance: 41,753; Referee: Jeff Winter

5 December 1998 16	Tottenham Hotspur	2–1	Liverpool	Tottenham, London
	Fox 28'; Carragher 50' (o.g.)		Berger 55'	Stadium: White Hart Lane; Attendance: 36,125

13 December 1998 17	Wimbledon	1–0	Liverpool	Croydon, London
	Earle 48'			Stadium: Selhurst Park; Attendance: 26,080

19 December 1998 18	Liverpool	2–0	Sheffield Wednesday	Liverpool, Merseyside
	Berger 19'; Owen 34'			Stadium: Anfield; Attendance: 40,003

26 December 1998 19	Middlesbrough	1–3	Liverpool	Middlesbrough, Teesside
	Deane 32'	Report	Owen 17'; Redknapp 35'; Heggem 88'	Stadium: Riverside Stadium; Attendance: 34,626

28 December 1998 20	Liverpool	4–2	Newcastle United	Liverpool, Merseyside
	Owen 67', 80'; Riedle 71', 84'		Solano 29'; Andersson 56'	Stadium: Anfield; Attendance: 44,605

9 January 1999 21	Arsenal	0–0	Liverpool	Islington, London
				Stadium: Highbury; Attendance: 38,107; Referee: Graham Barber

16 January 1999 22	Liverpool	7–1	Southampton	Liverpool, Merseyside
	Fowler 22', 32', 47'; Matteo 35'; Carragher 55'; Owen 63'; Thompson 73'	Report	Østenstad 59'	Stadium: Anfield; Attendance: 44,011; Referee: Uriah Rennie

30 January 1999 23	Coventry City	2–1	Liverpool	Coventry, West Midlands
	Boateng 60'; Whelan 71'		McManaman 86'	Stadium: Highfield Road; Attendance: 23,057

6 February 1999 24	Liverpool	3–1	Middlesbrough	Liverpool, Merseyside
	Owen 9'; Heggem 44'; Ince 45'		Stamp 86'	Stadium: Anfield; Attendance: 44,384

13 February 1999 25	Charlton Athletic	1–0	Liverpool	Charlton, London
	Jones 70'			Stadium: The Valley; Attendance: 20,043; Referee: Mike Reed

20 February 1999 26	Liverpool	2–2	West Ham United	Liverpool, Merseyside
	Fowler 22'; Owen 45'		Lampard 24' (pen.); Keller 74'	Stadium: Anfield; Attendance: 44,511

27 February 1999 27	Chelsea	2–1	Liverpool	Fulham, London
	Leboeuf 7'; Goldbæk 38'		Owen 77'	Stadium: Stamford Bridge; Attendance: 34,822; Referee: Paul Durkin

13 March 1999 28	Derby County	3–2	Liverpool	Derby, East Midlands
	Burton 12'; Wanchope 44', 49'		Fowler 36', 57' (pen.)	Stadium: Pride Park; Attendance: 32,913

3 April 1999 29	Liverpool	3–2	Everton	Liverpool, Merseyside
	Fowler 15' (pen.), 21'; Berger 82'		Dacourt 1'; Jeffers 84'	Stadium: Anfield; Attendance: 44,852

5 April 1999 30	Nottingham Forest	2–2	Liverpool	Nottingham, East Midlands
	Freedman 60'; Van Hooijdonk 90'		Redknapp 15'; Owen 72'	Stadium: The City Ground; Attendance: 28,374

12 April 1999 31	Leeds United	0–0	Liverpool	Leeds, Yorkshire
				Stadium: Elland Road; Attendance: 39,372

17 April 1999 32	Liverpool	0–1	Aston Villa	Liverpool, Merseyside
		Report	Taylor 33'	Stadium: Anfield; Attendance: 44,306

21 April 1999 33	Liverpool	0–1	Leicester City	Liverpool, Merseyside
		Report	Marshall 90'	Stadium: Anfield; Attendance: 36,019

24 April 1999 34	Blackburn Rovers	1–3	Liverpool	Blackburn, Lancashire
	Duff 63'		McManaman 23'; Redknapp 31'; Leonhardsen 32'	Stadium: Ewood Park; Attendance: 29,944; Referee: Rob Harris

1 May 1999 35	Liverpool	3–2	Tottenham Hotspur	Liverpool, Merseyside
	Redknapp 49' (pen.); Ince 77'; McManaman 79'		Carragher 13' (o.g.); Iversen 35'	Stadium: Anfield; Attendance: 44,007; Referee: Stephen Lodge

5 May 1999 36	Liverpool	2–2	Manchester United	Liverpool, Merseyside
	Redknapp 69' (pen.); Ince 89'		Yorke 23'; Irwin 56' (pen.), (red card) 75'	Stadium: Anfield; Attendance: 44,712; Referee: David Elleray

8 May 1999 37	Sheffield Wednesday	1–0	Liverpool	Sheffield, Yorkshire
	Cresswell 87'			Stadium: Hillsborough; Attendance: 27,383

16 May 1999 38	Liverpool	3–0	Wimbledon	Liverpool, Merseyside
	Berger 12'; Riedle 50'; Ince 65'	Report		Stadium: Anfield; Attendance: 41,792; Referee: Neale Barry

=== FA Cup ===
==== Matches ====
3 January 1999 3	Port Vale	0–3	Liverpool	Stoke-on-Trent, Staffordshire
			Owen 34' (pen.); Ince 38'; Fowler 90'	Stadium: Vale Park; Attendance: 16,557; Referee: Rob Harris

24 January 1999 4	Manchester United	2–1	Liverpool	Trafford, Greater Manchester
	Yorke 88'; Solskjær 90'	Report	Owen 3'	Stadium: Old Trafford; Attendance: 54,591; Referee: Graham Poll

=== League Cup ===
==== Matches ====
27 October 1998 3	Liverpool	3–1	Fulham	Liverpool, Merseyside
	Morgan 53' (o.g.); Fowler 66' (pen.); Ince 76'		Peschisolido 60'	Stadium: Anfield; Attendance: 22,296; Referee: Peter Jones

10 November 1998 4	Liverpool	1–3	Tottenham Hotspur	Liverpool, Merseyside
	Owen 81'		Iversen 2'; Scales 20'; Nielsen 62'	Stadium: Anfield; Attendance: 20,772; Referee: Gary Willard

=== UEFA Cup ===
==== Matches ====
15 September 1998 1	Košice (Slovakia)	0–3	(England) Liverpool	Košice, Slovakia
		Report	Berger 18'; Riedle 23'; Owen 59'	Stadium: Lokomotíva Stadium; Attendance: 4,500

29 September 1998 1	Liverpool (England)	5–0	(Slovakia) Košice	Liverpool, England
	Redknapp 23', 55'; Ince 52'; Fowler 53', 90'	Report		Stadium: Anfield; Attendance: 23,792

20 October 1998 2	Liverpool (England)	0–0	(Spain) Valencia	Liverpool, England
		Report		Stadium: Anfield; Attendance: 26,004

3 November 1998 2	Valencia (Spain)	2–2 (away goals)	(England) Liverpool	Valencia, Spain
	López 45', 90'	Report	McManaman 80'; Berger 85'	Stadium: Mestalla Stadium; Attendance: 53,000

24 November 1998 3	Celta Vigo (Spain)	3–1	(England) Liverpool	Vigo, Spain
	Mostovoi 49'; Karpin 56'; Gudelj 90'	Report	Owen 35'	Stadium: Balaídos; Attendance: 24,600

8 December 1998 3	Liverpool (England)	0–1	(Spain) Celta Vigo	Liverpool, England
		Report	Revivo 57'	Stadium: Anfield; Attendance: 30,289

== Statistics ==
=== Appearances and goals ===
No.	Pos	Nat	Player	Total		Premier League		FA Cup		League Cup		UEFA Cup	
No.	Pos	Nat	Player	Apps	Goals	Apps	Goals	Apps	Goals	Apps	Goals	Apps	Goals
Goalkeepers
1	GK	(England) ENG	David James	33	0	26	0	2	0	0	0	5	0
19	GK	(United States) USA	Brad Friedel	16	0	12	0	0	0	2	0	1+1	0
Defenders
3	DF	(Norway) NOR	Bjørn Tore Kvarme	8	0	2+5	0	0	0	0	0	1	0
4	DF	(Cameroon) CMR	Rigobert Song	13	0	10+3	0	0	0	0	0	0	0
5	DF	(Republic of Ireland) IRL	Steve Staunton	40	0	31	0	1	0	2	0	5+1	0
6	DF	(Republic of Ireland) IRL	Phil Babb	30	0	24+1	0	1	0	0	0	3+1	0
14	DF	(Norway) NOR	Vegard Heggem	36	2	27+2	2	1	0	1	0	4+1	0
20	DF	(Norway) NOR	Stig Inge Bjørnebye	31	0	20+3	0	2	0	2	0	4	0
21	DF	(England) ENG	Dominic Matteo	23	1	16+4	1	1	0	0	0	1+1	0
23	DF	(England) ENG	Jamie Carragher	44	1	34	1	2	0	2	0	6	0
Midfielders
7	MF	(England) ENG	Steve McManaman	31	5	25+3	4	0	0	0	0	3	1
8	MF	(Norway) NOR	Øyvind Leonhardsen	13	1	7+2	1	0	0	1	0	1+2	0
11	MF	(England) ENG	Jamie Redknapp	40	10	33+1	8	2	0	0	0	4	2
15	MF	(Czech Republic) CZE	Patrik Berger	41	9	30+2	7	2	0	1	0	6	2
17	MF	(England) ENG	Paul Ince	41	9	34	6	2	1	2	1	3	1
18	MF	(France) FRA	Jean-Michel Ferri	2	0	0+2	0	0	0	0	0	0	0
24	MF	(England) ENG	Danny Murphy	4	0	0+1	0	0	0	1+1	0	0+1	0
25	MF	(England) ENG	David Thompson	18	1	4+10	1	0	0	2	0	2	0
28	MF	(England) ENG	Steven Gerrard	13	0	4+8	0	0	0	0	0	1	0
Forwards
9	FW	(England) ENG	Robbie Fowler	35	18	23+2	14	1+1	1	2	1	5+1	2
10	FW	(England) ENG	Michael Owen	40	23	30	18	2	2	2	1	5+1	2
13	FW	(Germany) GER	Karl-Heinz Riedle	40	6	16+18	5	1	0	0+1	0	2+2	1
16	FW	(South Africa) RSA	Sean Dundee	5	0	0+3	0	0	0	0+1	0	0+1	0
Players transferred out during the season
4	MF	(Republic of Ireland) IRL	Jason McAteer	22	0	6+7	0	1+1	0	2	0	3+2	0
12	DF	(England) ENG	Steve Harkness	11	0	4+2	0	1+1	0	0+1	0	1+1	0

Last updated: 15 May 1999
Source: Competitions

=== Goal scorers ===
Rank	No.	Pos	Nat	Name	Premier League	FA Cup	League Cup	UEFA Cup	Total
1	10	FW	(England)	Michael Owen	18	2	1	2	23
2	9	FW	(England)	Robbie Fowler	14	1	1	2	18
3	11	MF	(England)	Jamie Redknapp	8	0	0	2	10
4	15	MF	(Czech Republic)	Patrick Berger	7	0	0	2	9
4	17	MF	(England)	Paul Ince	6	1	1	1	9
6	13	FW	(Germany)	Karl-Heinz Riedle	5	0	0	1	6
7	7	MF	(England)	Steve McManaman	4	0	0	1	5
8	14	DF	(Norway)	Vegard Heggem	2	0	0	0	2
9	8	MF	(Norway)	Øyvind Leonhardsen	1	0	0	0	1
9	21	DF	(England)	Dominic Matteo	1	0	0	0	1
9	23	DF	(England)	Jamie Carragher	1	0	0	0	1
9	25	MF	(England)	David Thompson	1	0	0	0	1
Own goal					0	0	1	0	1
Totals					68	4	4	11	87

=== Competition top scorers ===
Competition	Result	Top scorer
Premier League	7th	(England) Michael Owen, 18
UEFA Cup	Third round	(Czech Republic) Patrik Berger, 2 (England) Robbie Fowler, 2 (England) Michael Owen, 2 (England) Jamie Redknapp, 2
FA Cup	Fourth round	(England) Michael Owen, 2
League Cup	Fourth round	(England) Robbie Fowler, 1 (England) Paul Ince, 1 (England) Michael Owen, 1
Overall		(England) Michael Owen, 23
