= 1999–2000 Liverpool F.C. season =

English football club season

Liverpool
1999–2000 season
- Chairman: David Moores
- Manager: Gérard Houllier
- Premier League: 4th
- FA Cup: Fourth round
- League Cup: Third round
- Top goalscorer: League: Michael Owen (11); All: Michael Owen (12)
- Average home league attendance: 41,564
Home colours	Away colours	Third colours

The 1999–2000 season was Liverpool Football Club's 108th season in existence and their 38th consecutive season in the top-flight of English football. The club finished fourth in the Premier League, thus qualifying for the 2000–01 UEFA Cup.

== Players ==
=== First-team squad ===
Squad at end of season

Note: Flags indicate national team as defined under FIFA eligibility rules; some limited exceptions apply. Players may hold more than one non-FIFA nationality.

No.	Pos.	Nation	Player
1	GK	NED	Sander Westerveld
2	DF	SUI	Stéphane Henchoz
4	DF	CMR	Rigobert Song
5	DF	IRL	Steve Staunton
7	MF	CZE	Vladimír Šmicer
8	FW	ENG	Emile Heskey
9	FW	ENG	Robbie Fowler
10	FW	ENG	Michael Owen
11	MF	ENG	Jamie Redknapp
12	DF	FIN	Sami Hyypiä
14	MF	NOR	Vegard Heggem
15	MF	CZE	Patrik Berger
16	MF	GER	Dietmar Hamann

No.	Pos.	Nation	Player
18	FW	NED	Erik Meijer
19	GK	USA	Brad Friedel
21	DF	ENG	Dominic Matteo (Note: Matteo was born in Dumfries, Scotland, but was raised in England from the age of four and represented them at U-21 and B level before making his international debut for Scotland in November 2000.)
22	FW	GUI	Titi Camara
23	DF	ENG	Jamie Carragher
24	MF	ENG	Danny Murphy
25	MF	ENG	David Thompson
28	MF	ENG	Steven Gerrard
30	DF	FRA	Djimi Traoré (Note: Traoré was born in Saint-Ouen, France, but also qualified to represent Mali internationally and would make his international debut for Mali in 2004.)
31	DF	NOR	Frode Kippe
33	FW	ENG	Jon Newby
34	MF	WAL	Leyton Maxwell

=== Left club during season ===
Note: Flags indicate national team as defined under FIFA eligibility rules; some limited exceptions apply. Players may hold more than one non-FIFA nationality.

No.	Pos.	Nation	Player
3	DF	NOR	Bjørn Tore Kvarme (to Saint-Étienne)
13	FW	GER	Karl-Heinz Riedle (to Fulham)

== Reserve squad ==
Note: Flags indicate national team as defined under FIFA eligibility rules; some limited exceptions apply. Players may hold more than one non-FIFA nationality.

No.	Pos.	Nation	Player
6	DF	IRL	Phil Babb (Note: Babb was born in Lambeth, England, but also qualified to represent the Republic of Ireland internationally and made his international debut for the Republic of Ireland in 1994.)
20	DF	NOR	Stig Inge Bjørnebye
26	GK	DEN	Jørgen Nielsen
27	MF	ISL	Haukur Ingi Guðnason
29	DF	ENG	Stephen Wright
32	MF	IRL	Richie Partridge
—	GK	ENG	Ian Dunbavin
—	GK	ENG	Matthew Hogg
—	DF	ENG	John Boardman

No.	Pos.	Nation	Player
—	DF	ENG	Peter Cavanagh
—	DF	ENG	Neil Murphy
—	DF	ENG	Stephen Warnock
—	DF	IRL	Paul O'Mara
—	MF	ENG	Alan Navarro
—	MF	ENG	Chris O'Brien
—	FW	ENG	John Miles
—	FW	ENG	Chris Thompson
—	FW	ENG	Stephen Torpey

== Transfers ==
=== In ===
- (Finland) Sami Hyypiä - (Netherlands) Willem II, 18 May, £2,600,000
- (Guinea) Titi Camara - (France) Marseille, 2 June, £2,600,000
- (Switzerland) Stéphane Henchoz - (England) Blackburn Rovers, 3 June, £3,500,000
- (Netherlands) Sander Westerveld - (Netherlands) Vitesse, 15 June, £4,100,000
- (Czech Republic) Vladimír Šmicer - (France) Lens,1 July, £4,200,000
- (Netherlands) Erik Meijer - (Germany) Bayer Leverkusen, 1 July, Free
- (Germany) Dietmar Hamann - (England) Newcastle United, 22 July, £8,300,000
- (England) Emile Heskey - (England) Leicester City, 10 March, £11,400,000

=== Out ===
- (England) David James - (England) Aston Villa, 23 June, £1,800,000
- (England) Steve McManaman - (Spain) Real Madrid, 1 July, free
- (France) Jean-Michel Ferri - (France) Sochaux, 14 July, £1,500,000
- (England) Tony Warner (Note: Warner was born in Liverpool, England, but also qualified to represent Trinidad and Tobago internationally and would make his international debut for Trinidad and Tobago in February 2006.) - (England) Millwall, 17 July, free
- (England) Jamie Cassidy - (England) Cambridge United, 22 July, free
- (South Africa) Sean Dundee (Note: Dundee was born in Durban, South Africa, but also holds German nationality and would make his international debut for the Germany B team in March 2000.) - (Germany) Stuttgart, 30 July, £1,100,000
- (England) Paul Ince - (England) Middlesbrough, 30 July, £1,200,000
- (Norway) Øyvind Leonhardsen - (England) Tottenham Hotspur, 6 August, £3,300,000
- (Norway) Bjørn Tore Kvarme - (France) Saint-Étienne, 30 August, £1,200,000
- (Germany) Karl-Heinz Riedle - (England) Fulham, 28 September, £204,000
- (England) Ian Dunbavin - (England) Shrewsbury Town, 22 January, free
- (Wales) Eifion Jones - (England) Blackpool, 23 March, free
- (England) Rob Jones - (England) West Ham United, free, 24 July

== Events of the season ==
After a disappointing seventh-place finish the previous season, which left Liverpool without even UEFA Cup qualification, manager Gérard Houllier began to rebuild his squad and made seven close season signings. The attack was bolstered with the arrival of Titi Camara, Erik Meijer and Vladimír Šmicer. Succeeding Aston Villa-bound David James in goal was Dutchman Sander Westerveld. A new look central defence featured Stéphane Henchoz and Sami Hyypiä. Following the summer departure of former captain Paul Ince, Jamie Redknapp was made the new captain of the side, with Robbie Fowler appointed as vice-captain.

The season began on 7 August 1999 with a 2–1 win at Sheffield Wednesday, with Robbie Fowler and the debutant Titi Camara finding the net. However, the next game saw newly promoted Watford – in the top flight for the first time in over a decade – travel to Anfield and come away surprise 1–0 winners. Defeat followed in the next game as Liverpool travelled to Middlesbrough, but then came victories over Leeds United and Arsenal which saw the Reds occupy eighth place as the first month of the season drew to a close.

September saw the Reds navigate the second round of the Football League Cup with a comfortable aggregate win over financially troubled Division Three side Hull City, though they failed to achieve any victories in the league, losing 3–2 at home to Manchester United (with Jamie Carragher scoring two own goals), drawing 2–2 at Leicester City and finally losing 1–0 at home to Everton in the Merseyside derby. This left Liverpool 12th by the end of September, while their cross-city rivals were showing signs of a revival after three dismal seasons by occupying sixth place. Things improved slightly in October with two league victories over Chelsea and West Ham United. Southampton had ended Liverpool's League Cup hopes with a third round defeat earlier in the month, which ended with Liverpool's league standing slightly improved to ninth place. With a third of the season now gone, they were eight points off the top of a table being led by Leeds United.

November was a much better month for the Reds, who achieved wins over Bradford, Derby County and Sunderland to occupy fifth place by 20 November. They were now just six points behind leaders Manchester United. However, the month ended on a low note as they lost 1–0 at West Ham United.

Liverpool's revival continued in December as they beat struggling Sheffield Wednesday 4–1 at Anfield. With the FA Cup third round unusually being played before Christmas, they travelled to Division One promotion chasers Huddersfield Town on 12 December and came away 2-0 victors. A 2–0 win over Coventry City on 18 December meant that the Reds were still fifth in the league at Christmas, six points behind Manchester United.

Their FA Cup quest ended in a shock 1–0 fourth round defeat at home to Blackburn Rovers.

Liverpool's attack was bolstered with the club record £11 million signing of Leicester City's Emile Heskey on 10 March 2000.

The first two months of the new millennium saw mixed results for the Reds, but many of the teams around them dropped points as well, meaning that by mid February they were third in the league and just six points behind leaders Manchester United, who had a game in hand. There now appeared to be a realistic chance that the Reds might finally be able to end their ten-year wait for the league title. Three successive draws followed in March, then came a five-match winning run which lifted them to second place by 16 April. However, Manchester United now had an 11-point lead at the top of the table with just five games remaining, and needed just five points from those remaining games to be certain of retaining the league title. However, Liverpool still had something to play for, as the top three places in the Premier League now meant Champions League qualification. Competition for second and third place was still fierce, with Arsenal, Leeds United, Chelsea and Aston Villa all in close contention.

However, the season ended with a disastrous run of results. A goalless draw at Goodison Park in the Merseyside derby was followed by a 2–0 defeat at Chelsea. Emile Heskey's first game against old club Leicester on 3 May was a disaster as the East Midlanders came away from Anfield with a 2–0 victory. A goalless draw against Southampton followed, and on the final day of the season, 14 May, the Reds travelled to a Bradford City side battling it out with Wimbledon to avoid the last relegation place. An early David Wetherall goal gave Bradford a 1–0 win over the Reds, who surrendered a Champions League place and were forced to settle for a place in the UEFA Cup instead. The result also relegated Wimbledon, who, 12 years to the day, had beaten the Reds in one of the greatest FA Cup final shocks of all time.

== Statistics ==
=== Appearances and goals ===
As of 14 May 2000
Players with no appearances not included in the list

No.	Pos	Nat	Player	Total		FA Premier League		FA Cup		League Cup	
No.	Pos	Nat	Player	Apps	Goals	Apps	Goals	Apps	Goals	Apps	Goals
1	GK	(Netherlands) NED	Sander Westerveld	39	0	36	0	2	0	1	0
2	DF	(Switzerland) SUI	Stéphane Henchoz	33	0	29	0	2	0	2	0
4	DF	(Cameroon) CMR	Rigobert Song	21	0	14+4	0	0+1	0	2	0
5	DF	(Republic of Ireland) IRL	Steve Staunton	16	1	7+5	0	1	0	3	1
7	MF	(Czech Republic) CZE	Vladimír Šmicer	25	1	13+8	1	2	0	2	0
8	FW	(England) ENG	Emile Heskey	12	3	12	3	0	0	0	0
9	FW	(England) ENG	Robbie Fowler	14	3	8+6	3	0	0	0	0
10	FW	(England) ENG	Michael Owen	30	12	22+5	11	1	0	2	1
11	MF	(England) ENG	Jamie Redknapp	23	3	18+4	3	0	0	1	0
12	DF	(Finland) FIN	Sami Hyypiä	42	2	38	2	2	0	2	0
14	DF	(Norway) NOR	Vegard Heggem	25	1	10+12	1	0	0	1+2	0
15	MF	(Czech Republic) CZE	Patrik Berger	37	9	34	9	1	0	1+1	0
16	MF	(Germany) GER	Dietmar Hamann	30	1	27+1	1	2	0	0	0
18	FW	(Netherlands) NED	Erik Meijer	24	2	7+14	0	0	0	3	2
19	GK	(United States) USA	Brad Friedel	4	0	2	0	0	0	2	0
21	DF	(Scotland) SCO	Dominic Matteo	34	1	32	0	1+1	1	0	0
22	FW	(Guinea) GUI	Titi Camara	37	10	22+11	9	2	1	0+2	0
23	DF	(England) ENG	Jamie Carragher	40	0	33+3	0	2	0	2	0
24	MF	(England) ENG	Danny Murphy	27	6	9+14	3	2	0	2	3
25	MF	(England) ENG	David Thompson	31	3	19+8	3	0+1	0	3	0
28	MF	(England) ENG	Steven Gerrard	31	1	26+3	1	2	0	0	0
31	DF	(Norway) NOR	Frode Kippe	1	0	0+1	0	0	0	0	0
33	FW	(England) ENG	Jon Newby	4	0	0+1	0	0+2	0	0+1	0
34	MF	(Wales) WAL	Leyton Maxwell	1	1	0	0	0	0	0+1	1
Players featured for club who have left:
13	FW	(Germany) GER	Karl-Heinz Riedle	2	2	0+1	0	0	0	1	2

=== Top scorers ===
Competition	Result	Top Scorer
Premier League	4th	(England) Michael Owen, 11
FA Cup	Fourth round	(Guinea) Titi Camara, 1 (Scotland) Dominic Matteo, 1
League Cup	Third round	(England) Danny Murphy, 3
Overall		(England) Michael Owen, 12

=== Disciplinary record ===
As of 14 May 2000

No.	Pos.	Name	FA Premier League		FA Cup		League Cup		Total	
No.	Pos.	Name	Yellow card	Red card	Yellow card	Red card	Yellow card	Red card	Yellow card	Red card
1	GK	Sander Westerveld	0	1	0	0	0	0	0	1
2	DF	Stéphane Henchoz	8	0	0	0	1	0	9	0
4	DF	Rigobert Song	2	0	0	0	0	0	2	0
5	DF	Steve Staunton	2	1	0	0	0	0	2	1
7	MF	Vladimír Šmicer	1	0	0	0	0	0	1	0
9	FW	Robbie Fowler	1	0	0	0	0	0	1	0
10	FW	Michael Owen	2	0	0	0	0	0	2	0
11	MF	Jamie Redknapp	4	0	0	0	0	0	4	0
12	DF	Sami Hyypiä	2	0	0	0	0	0	2	0
15	MF	Patrik Berger	2	0	0	0	0	0	2	0
16	MF	Dietmar Hamann	6	0	1	0	0	0	7	0
18	FW	Erik Meijer	2	0	0	0	0	0	2	0
21	DF	Dominic Matteo	2	0	0	0	0	0	2	0
22	FW	Titi Camara	7	0	0	0	0	0	7	0
23	DF	Jamie Carragher	4	0	0	0	0	0	4	0
24	MF	Danny Murphy	3	0	0	0	0	0	3	0
25	MF	David Thompson	7	1	0	0	0	0	7	1
28	MF	Steven Gerrard	5	1	0	0	0	0	5	1
Total			60	4	1	0	1	0	62	4

== Pre-season and friendlies ==
Date	Opponents	H / A	Result F–A	Scorers
16 July 1999	German XI	A	8–0	Fowler (3), Berger (2), Murphy, Camara, Heggem
20 July 1999	Wolverhampton Wanderers	A	2–0	Fowler 26', Riedle 80'
22 July 1999	Linfield	A	4–0	Porter 14' (o.g.), Murphy 46', Redknapp 52' (pen.), Berger 63'
24 July 1999	Feyenoord	N	2–0	Šmicer 53', Camara 61'
29 July 1999	Valerenga	A	4–1	Riedle 21', Hamann 32', Kjølner 50' (o.g.), Meijer 60'
31 July 1999	Blackburn Rovers	A	2–2	Fowler 22', Berger 40'
3 August 1999	Manchester City	A	1–2	Thompson 42'
18 October 1999	Omagh Town	A	7–1	Camara 23', 69', Meijer 37', 44', Šmicer 44', Berger 73', Redknapp 77'
16 February 2000	Bournemouth	A	4–0	Partridge 8', Berger 21', Murphy 32', Camara 52'
16 May 2000	Celtic	H	4–1	Meijer 37', 61', Thompson 45', Camara 53'
21 May 2000	Ireland XI	A	2–4	Heskey 3', Owen 84'

== Competitions ==
=== Premier League ===
==== League Table ====
Pos	Team	Pld	W	D	L	GF	GA	GD	Pts	Qualification or relegation
2	Arsenal	38	22	7	9	73	43	+30	73	Qualification for the Champions League first group stage
3	Leeds United	38	21	6	11	58	43	+15	69	Qualification for the Champions League third qualifying round
4	Liverpool	38	19	10	9	51	30	+21	67	Qualification for the UEFA Cup first round (Note: Chelsea qualified for the UEFA Cup as FA Cup winners.)
5	Chelsea	38	18	11	9	53	34	+19	65	Qualification for the UEFA Cup first round
6	Aston Villa	38	15	13	10	46	35	+11	58	Qualification for the Intertoto Cup third round

Source: Premier League
Rules for classification: 1) points; 2) goal difference; 3) number of goals scored.

==== Results summary ====
Overall								Home						Away					
Pld	W	D	L	GF	GA	GD	Pts	W	D	L	GF	GA	GD	W	D	L	GF	GA	GD
38	19	10	9	51	30	+21	67	11	4	4	28	13	+15	8	6	5	23	17	+6

Source: 1999-2000 FA Premier League table

==== Results by round ====
Round	1	2	3	4	5	6	7	8	9	10	11	12	13	14	15	16	17	18	19	20	21	22	23	24	25	26	27	28	29	30	31	32	33	34	35	36	37	38
Ground	A	H	A	A	H	H	A	H	A	H	A	H	H	H	A	A	H	H	A	H	A	A	H	H	A	A	H	H	A	H	A	H	A	A	A	H	H	A
Result	W	L	L	W	W	L	D	L	D	W	D	W	W	W	W	L	W	W	D	W	L	W	D	W	W	D	D	D	W	W	W	W	W	D	L	L	D	L
Position	6	13	17	9	8	12	12	12	12	11	11	9	6	5	5	6	5	5	5	5	5	4	4	4	3	4	4	3	3	3	3	2	2	2	3	4	3	4

Source: 11v11.com: 1999-2000 Liverpool results
A = Away; H = Home; W = Win; D = Draw; L = Loss

==== Matches ====
7 August 1999 1	Sheffield Wednesday	1–2	Liverpool	Sheffield, South Yorkshire
	Carbone 88'	Report	Fowler 75'; Camara 84'	Stadium: Hillsborough; Attendance: 34,853; Referee: Graham Poll

14 August 1999 2	Liverpool	0–1	Watford	Liverpool, Merseyside
		Report	Mooney 14'	Stadium: Anfield; Attendance: 44,174; Referee: Alan Wilkie

21 August 1999 3	Middlesbrough	1–0	Liverpool	Middlesbrough, North Yorkshire
	Deane 49'	Report		Stadium: Riverside Stadium; Attendance: 34,783; Referee: Steve Dunn

23 August 1999 4	Leeds United	1–2	Liverpool	Leeds, Yorkshire
	Song 20' (o.g.)	Report	Camara 45'; Radebe 55' (o.g.)	Stadium: Elland Road; Attendance: 39,703; Referee: David Elleray

28 August 1999 5	Liverpool	2–0	Arsenal	Liverpool, Merseyside
	Fowler 8'; Berger 76'	Report		Stadium: Anfield; Attendance: 44,886; Referee: Dermot Gallagher

11 September 1999 6	Liverpool	2–3	Manchester United	Liverpool, Merseyside
	Hyypiä 23'; Berger 69'	Report	Carragher 4', 44' (o.g.); Cole 18', (red card) 70'	Stadium: Anfield; Attendance: 44,929; Referee: Graham Barber

18 September 1999 7	Leicester City	2–2	Liverpool	Leicester, East Midlands
	Cottee 2'; Sinclair (red card); Izzet 81'	Report	Owen 23' (pen.), 39'	Stadium: Filbert Street; Attendance: 21,623; Referee: Uriah Rennie

27 September 1999 8	Liverpool	0–1	Everton	Liverpool, Merseyside
	Westerveld (red card) 75'; Gerrard (red card) 90'	Report	Campbell 4'; Jeffers (red card) 75'	Stadium: Anfield; Attendance: 44,802; Referee: Mike Riley

2 October 1999 9	Aston Villa	0–0	Liverpool	Birmingham, West Midlands
		Report	Staunton (red card)	Stadium: Villa Park; Attendance: 39,217; Referee: Rob Harris

16 October 1999 10	Liverpool	1–0	Chelsea	Liverpool, Merseyside
	Thompson 47'	Report	Desailly (red card) 75'; Wise (red card) 88'	Stadium: Anfield; Attendance: 44,826; Referee: Mike Reed

23 October 1999 11	Southampton	1–1	Liverpool	Southampton, Hampshire
	Soltvedt 39'		Camara 81'	Stadium: The Dell; Attendance: 15,241

27 October 1999 13	Liverpool	1–0	West Ham United	Liverpool, Merseyside
	Camara 43'	Report		Stadium: Anfield; Attendance: 44,012; Referee: Stephen Lodge

1 November 1999 12	Liverpool	3–1	Bradford City	Liverpool, Merseyside
	Camara 20'; Redknapp 41' (pen.); Heggem 80'	Report	Windass 12'	Stadium: Anfield; Attendance: 40,483; Referee: Jeff Winter

6 November 1999 14	Liverpool	2–0	Derby County	Liverpool, Merseyside
	Murphy 65'; Redknapp 69'	Report		Stadium: Anfield; Attendance: 44,467; Referee: Uriah Rennie

20 November 1999 15	Sunderland	0–2	Liverpool	Sunderland, Wearside
		Report	Owen 63'; Berger 85'	Stadium: Stadium of Light; Attendance: 42,015; Referee: Dermot Gallagher

27 November 1999 16	West Ham United	1–0	Liverpool	Newham, London
	Sinclair 44'	Report		Stadium: Upton Park; Attendance: 26,043; Referee: Graham Barber

5 December 1999 17	Liverpool	4–1	Sheffield Wednesday	Liverpool, Merseyside
	Hyypiä 21'; Murphy 41'; Gerrard 69'; Thompson 78'	Report	Alexandersson 19'	Stadium: Anfield; Attendance: 42,517; Referee: Paul Durkin

18 December 1999 18	Liverpool	2–0	Coventry City	Liverpool, Merseyside
	Owen 45'; Camara 74'	Report		Stadium: Anfield; Attendance: 44,024; Referee: Andy D'Urso

26 December 1999 19	Newcastle United	2–2	Liverpool	Newcastle-upon-Tyne, Tyneside
	Shearer 12'; Ferguson 57'	Report	Owen 29', 45'	Stadium: St. James' Park; Attendance: 36,445

28 December 1999 20	Liverpool	3–1	Wimbledon	Liverpool, Merseyside
	Owen 58'; Berger 68'; Fowler 80'	Report	Gayle 64'	Stadium: Anfield; Attendance: 44,107; Referee: Neale Barry

3 January 2000 21	Tottenham Hotspur	1–0	Liverpool	Haringey, London
	Armstrong 23'	Report		Stadium: White Hart Lane; Attendance: 36,044; Referee: Alan Wilkie

15 January 2000 22	Watford	2–3	Liverpool	Watford, Hertfordshire
	R. Johnson 44'; Helguson 46'	Report	Berger 10'; Thompson 41'; Šmicer 71'	Stadium: Vicarage Road; Attendance: 21,367; Referee: Stephen Lodge

22 January 2000 23	Liverpool	0–0	Middlesbrough	Liverpool, Merseyside
		Report		Stadium: Anfield; Attendance: 44,324; Referee: Steve Dunn

5 February 2000 24	Liverpool	3–1	Leeds United	Liverpool, Merseyside
	Hamann 20'; Berger 69'; Murphy 90'	Report	Bowyer 62'	Stadium: Anfield; Attendance: 44,793; Referee: Mike Reed

13 February 2000 25	Arsenal	0–1	Liverpool	Islington, London
		Report	Camara 18'	Stadium: Highbury; Attendance: 38,098; Referee: Steve Dunn

4 March 2000 26	Manchester United	1–1	Liverpool	Trafford, Greater Manchester
	Solskjær 45'	Report	Berger 28'	Stadium: Old Trafford; Attendance: 61,592; Referee: Dermot Gallagher

11 March 2000 27	Liverpool	1–1	Sunderland	Liverpool, Merseyside
	Berger 2' (pen.)	Report	Phillips 77' (pen.)	Stadium: Anfield; Attendance: 44,693; Referee: Graham Poll

15 March 2000 34	Liverpool	0–0	Aston Villa	Liverpool, Merseyside
		Report		Stadium: Anfield; Attendance: 43,615; Referee: Steve Bennett

18 March 2000 28	Derby County	0–2	Liverpool	Derby, East Midlands
		Report	Owen 17'; Camara 86'	Stadium: Pride Park Stadium; Attendance: 33,378; Referee: Barry Knight

25 March 2000 29	Liverpool	2–1	Newcastle United	Liverpool, Merseyside
	Camara 51'; Redknapp 88'	Report	Shearer 67'	Stadium: Anfield; Attendance: 44,743; Referee: Paul Durkin

1 April 2000 30	Coventry City	0–3	Liverpool	Coventry, West Midlands
		Report	Owen 23', 38'; Heskey 78'	Stadium: Highfield Road; Attendance: 23,098; Referee: Mike Reed

9 April 2000 31	Liverpool	2–0	Tottenham Hotspur	Liverpool, Merseyside
	Berger 34'; Owen 61'	Report		Stadium: Anfield; Attendance: 44,536; Referee: Stephen Lodge

16 April 2000 32	Wimbledon	1–2	Liverpool	Croydon, London
	Andersen 70'	Report	Heskey 37', 62'	Stadium: Selhurst Park; Attendance: 26,102; Referee: Mike Riley

21 April 2000 33	Everton	0–0	Liverpool	Liverpool, Merseyside
		Report		Stadium: Goodison Park; Attendance: 40,052; Referee: Graham Poll

29 April 2000 35	Chelsea	2–0	Liverpool	Fulham, London
	Weah 2'; Di Matteo 14'	Report		Stadium: Stamford Bridge; Attendance: 34,957; Referee: Graham Barber

3 May 2000 36	Liverpool	0–2	Leicester City	Liverpool, Merseyside
		Report	Cottee 2'; Gilchrist 48'	Stadium: Anfield; Attendance: 43,456; Referee: Graham Poll

7 May 2000 37	Liverpool	0–0	Southampton	Liverpool, Merseyside
		Report		Stadium: Anfield; Attendance: 44,015; Referee: Paul Alcock

14 May 2000 38	Bradford City	1–0	Liverpool	Bradford, Yorkshire
	Wetherall 12'	Report		Stadium: Valley Parade; Attendance: 18,276; Referee: Dermot Gallagher

=== FA Cup ===
==== Matches ====
12 December 1999 3	Huddersfield Town	0–2	Liverpool	Huddersfield, Yorkshire
		Report	Camara 36'; Matteo 59'	Stadium: McAlpine Stadium; Attendance: 23,678; Referee: Rob Harris

10 January 2000 4	Liverpool	0–1	Blackburn Rovers	Liverpool, Merseyside
		Report	Blake 84'	Stadium: Anfield; Attendance: 32,839; Referee: Graham Poll

=== League Cup ===
==== Matches ====
14 September 1999 2 First-leg	Hull City	1–5	Liverpool	Hull, Yorkshire
	Brown 60'	Report	Murphy 10', 30'; Meijer 48', 75'; Staunton 89'	Stadium: Boothferry Park; Attendance: 10,034; Referee: Ken Leach

21 September 1999 2 Second-leg	Liverpool	4–2	Hull City	Liverpool, Merseyside
	Murphy 33'; Maxwell 46'; Riedle 65', 89'	Report	Eyre 51' (pen.); Alcide 56'	Stadium: Anfield; Attendance: 24,318; Referee: John Brandwood

13 October 1999 3	Southampton	2–1	Liverpool	Southampton, Hampshire
	Richards 67'; Soltvedt 90'	Report	Owen 53'	Stadium: The Dell; Attendance: 13,822; Referee: Dermot Gallagher
