= Dominic Matteo =

Scottish footballer (born 1974)

Personal information
- Full name: Dominic Matteo
- Date of birth: 28 April 1974 (age 52)
- Place of birth: Dumfries, Scotland
- Height: 6 ft 1 in (1.85 m)
- Positions: Defender; midfielder

Youth career
- 1983–1984: Birkdale United
- 1984–1992: Liverpool

Senior career*
Years	Team	Apps	(Gls)
1992–2000	Liverpool	127	(2)
1995	→ Sunderland (loan)	1	(0)
2000–2004	Leeds United	115	(2)
2004–2007	Blackburn Rovers	34	(0)
2007–2009	Stoke City	23	(1)
Total		300	(5)

International career
1994–1998	England U21	4	(0)
1998	England B	1	(0)
2000–2002	Scotland	6	(0)
- * Club domestic league appearances and goals

Dominic Matteo (/ˈmætioʊ/ MAT-ee-oh; born 28 April 1974) is a Scottish former professional footballer who played as a defender and midfielder in a 17-year professional career from 1992 to 2009. He made a total of 366 league and cup appearances, of which 276 were in the Premier League.

Matteo played for Liverpool, Sunderland, Leeds United, Blackburn Rovers and Stoke City. His most notable individual moment was his goal in the Champions League against A.C. Milan. The latter part of his career was increasingly affected by injuries, which led to his retirement in 2009 at the age of 35. He struggled with gambling addictions and was declared bankrupt in 2015. He was capped six times by Scotland after originally representing England at under-21 and 'B' team level.

== Early life ==
Dominic Matteo was born in Dumfries on 28 April 1974. His birth mother, Margaret, was a 17-year-old pupil when she became pregnant. She named him Stephen. Very young and without an income, she made "the most difficult decision of my life" in putting him up for adoption, being persuaded that it was the best decision by the adoption agency when told about his adoptive parents.

Matteo's adoptive father, who "wanted his boy to play like Cesare Maldini", ran Matthew's Cafe in Friars Vennel. His adoptive father had Italian heritage and was a keen follower of European football. The family moved to Southport in late 1978. When he was seven, his adoptive parents, Albert and Marie, told him that he was adopted, along with his older brother.

== Club career ==
=== Liverpool ===
Matteo was spotted playing for Birkdale United by Liverpool player Kenny Dalglish, who had originally gone to Birkdale United just to watch his son, Paul Dalglish. He progressed to a YTS contract at the age of 16. His versatility counted against him, as he was asked to play several positions in the reserve team and subsequently failed to establish himself in one position. However, he impressed enough to win a one-year professional contract at the age of 18. He then signed a new two-year contract in 1993.

He made his Premier League debut for the "Reds" on 23 October 1993, when he replaced an injured John Barnes at left-wing in a 1–1 draw with Manchester City at Maine Road. He made a total of 13 appearances during the 1993–94 season. He joined Mick Buxton's Sunderland on loan in March 1995, but made just one First Division appearance for the "Black Cats", in a 2–0 defeat to Barnsley at Oakwell on 24 March. After the game it transpired that his loan had not been registered in time, leaving him unable to play for Sunderland; though he had technically been an ineligible player against Barnsley, Sunderland escaped with only a £2,500 fine.

He scored two goals for Liverpool, one against Southampton in the Premier League and another against Huddersfield Town in the FA Cup. After making arguably his biggest impact at Anfield in the 1999–2000 season, Matteo was expected to become a first team regular, but was instead sold to Leeds United in August 2000. He made 155 appearances and scored two goals for Liverpool.

=== Leeds United ===
In August 2000 he joined Leeds United despite failing his medical with the club. He made his team debut against AC Milan the following month, in a UEFA Champions League contest. He was one of Leeds' best players through their 2000–01 Champions League campaign, in which they achieved a semi-final place. He is fondly remembered by Leeds fans especially for the goal he scored at the San Siro against Milan, in the first group stage which ensured they would progress through to the next round. He ended that Champions League campaign with two goals, having also scored earlier against Beşiktaş.

When Rio Ferdinand moved to Manchester United in the summer of 2002, Matteo was handed team captaincy. Leeds were relegated at the end of 2003–04, despite Matteo's two goals against Fulham and Wolverhampton Wanderers.

His book, In My Defence, was published in 2011. In an interview, given at the time of the book's release, he said that he had liked working with David O'Leary and Peter Ridsdale at Leeds; " I loved working with David. He had been a great central defender at Arsenal. But, as things started to get on top of us, he spent more time in his office. He was nowhere near a failure and, if you finished fifth now, you would not expect the sack."

=== Blackburn Rovers ===
In July 2004, Matteo signed a three-year contract with Blackburn Rovers. He made his Blackburn debut against West Bromwich Albion in a 1–1 draw. He scored his first and only goal for Blackburn in a 3–0 win over Colchester United in the FA Cup.

=== Stoke City ===
In January 2007, Matteo moved to Championship side Stoke City on a free transfer. Signing a short-term contract until the summer, he played a total of 10 games and scoring one goal against Derby County. Matteo still continued to play for Stoke during the club's 2007–08 pre-season campaign, despite being out of contract. However, he was offered a new 12-month contract by the club on 10 August 2007. He was made captain by Tony Pulis in the season Stoke won promotion back to the top flight of the English football league system. Matteo played 13 league games up to the end of October after which he played only once more before the end of the season, a game in November 2007. This was the last game of his playing career due to injury.

== International career ==
Matteo won Under-21 and 'B' caps for England, and was also called up for the main squad on two occasions but was never capped. He later was called up for the Scotland side, having been born and lived as a young boy in Dumfries. He went on to collect six caps for Scotland, making his debut against Australia in November 2000. After injury problems, he retired from international duty to concentrate on his career at Leeds United.

== Personal life ==
While at Stoke Matteo progressed studying for his UEFA coaching qualifications.

In his autobiography and interviews associated with its launch, Matteo admitted having run up over £1,000,000 in gambling debts. He recalled betting £200,000 on a single horse race, although that bet won. Matteo was declared bankrupt in 2015. His book also repeatedly referenced Matteo being involved in a culture of heavy drinking.

In May 2013, Matteo returned to Leeds United in a new role as a Football Ambassador. He left this position in the summer of 2014 following a change of ownership to Massimo Cellino. In November 2019, Matteo underwent surgery on a brain tumour, and was declared fully recovered in April the following year.

== Career statistics ==
Appearances and goals by club, season and competition
Club	Season	League			FA Cup		League Cup		Europe		Total	
Club	Season	Division	Apps	Goals	Apps	Goals	Apps	Goals	Apps	Goals	Apps	Goals
Liverpool	1993–94	Premier League	11	0	0	0	2	0	—		13	0
Liverpool	1994–95	Premier League	7	0	1	0	0	0	—		8	0
Liverpool	1995–96	Premier League	5	0	1	0	0	0	0	0	6	0
Liverpool	1996–97	Premier League	26	0	2	0	3	0	7 (Note: Appearance/s in the UEFA Cup.) (Note: Appearance/s in the European Cup Winner's Cup.)	0	38	0
Liverpool	1997–98	Premier League	26	0	1	0	4	0	2	0	33	0
Liverpool	1998–99	Premier League	20	1	1	0	0	0	2	0	23	1
Liverpool	1999–2000	Premier League	32	0	2	1	0	0	—		34	1
Liverpool	Total		127	1	8	1	9	0	11	0	155	2
Sunderland (loan)	1994–95	First Division	1	0	—		—		—		1	0
Leeds United	2000–01	Premier League	30	0	2	0	1	0	15 (Note: Appearance/s and goal/s in the UEFA Champions League.)	2	48	2
Leeds United	2001–02	Premier League	32	0	0	0	1	0	7	0	40	0
Leeds United	2002–03	Premier League	20	0	3	0	0	0	1	0	24	0
Leeds United	2003–04	Premier League	33	2	1	0	0	0	—		34	2
Leeds United	Total		115	2	6	0	2	0	23	2	146	4
Blackburn Rovers	2004–05	Premier League	28	0	4	1	0	0	—		32	1
Blackburn Rovers	2005–06	Premier League	6	0	1	0	0	0	—		7	0
Blackburn Rovers	2006–07	Premier League	0	0	0	0	0	0	0	0	0	0
Blackburn Rovers	Total		34	0	5	1	0	0	0	0	39	1
Stoke City	2006–07	Championship	9	1	1	0	—		—		10	1
Stoke City	2007–08	Championship	14	0	0	0	0	0	—		14	0
Stoke City	2008–09	Premier League	0	0	0	0	1	0	—		1	0
Stoke City	Total		23	1	1	0	1	0	—		25	1
Career total			300	4	20	2	12	0	34	2	366	8

Appearances and goals by national team and year
National team	Year	Apps	Goals
Scotland	2000	1	0
Scotland	2001	4	0
Scotland	2002	1	0
Total		6	0
