= Michael Owen =

English footballer (born 1979)

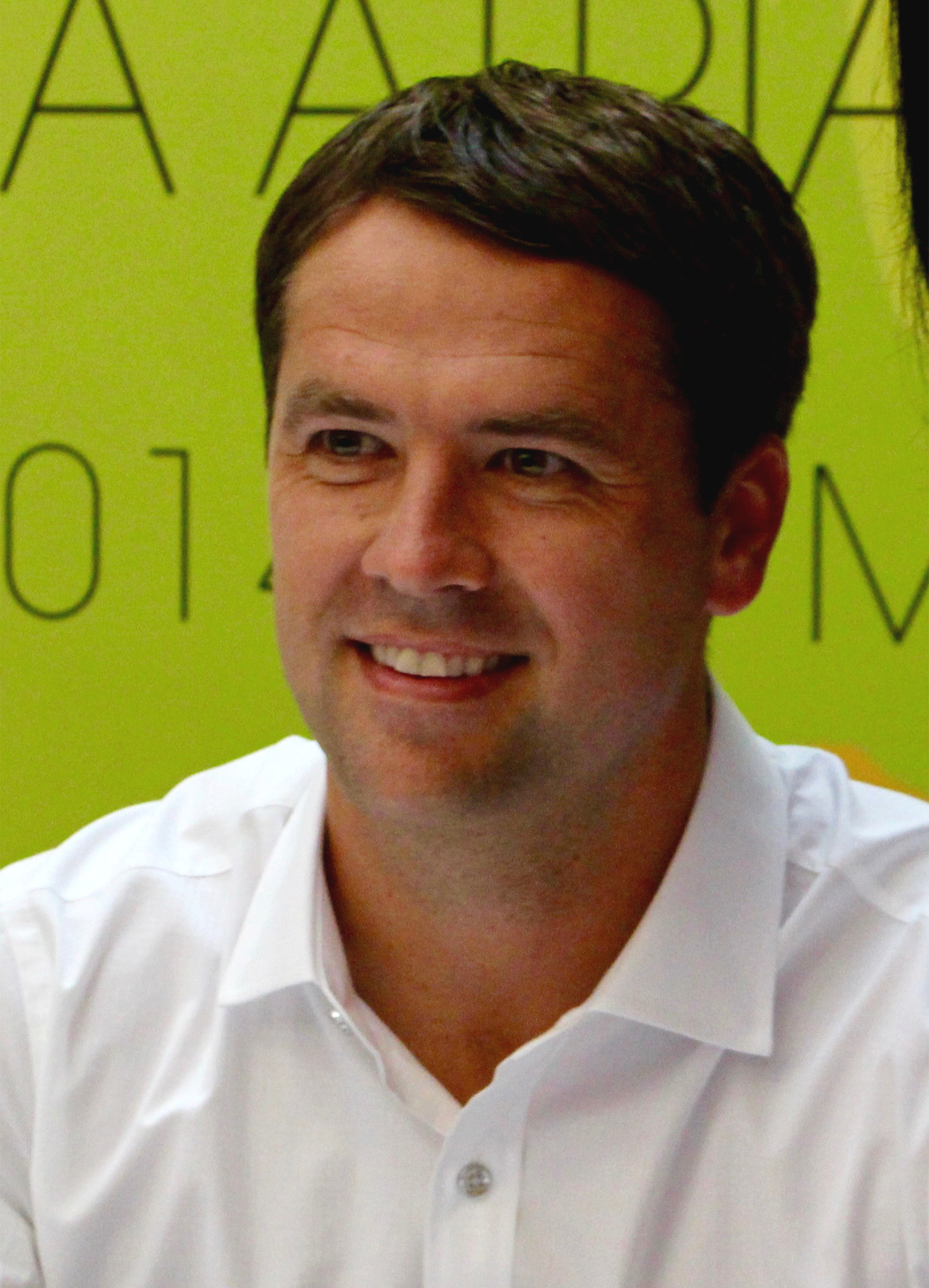
- Owen in 2014

Personal information
- Full name: Michael James Owen
- Date of birth: 14 December 1979 (age 46)
- Place of birth: Chester, England
- Height: 5 ft 8 in (1.73 m)
- Position: Striker

Youth career
- Mold Alexandra
- 1991–1996: Liverpool

Senior career*
Years	Team	Apps	(Gls)
1996–2004	Liverpool	216	(118)
2004–2005	Real Madrid	36	(13)
2005–2009	Newcastle United	71	(26)
2009–2012	Manchester United	31	(5)
2012–2013	Stoke City	8	(1)
Total		362	(163)

International career
	England U15	8	(15)
	England U16	11	(15)
	England U18	14	(10)
1997	England U20	4	(3)
1997	England U21	1	(1)
2006–2007	England B	2	(0)
1998–2008	England	89	(40)
- * Club domestic league appearances and goals

Michael James Owen (born 14 December 1979) is an English former professional footballer who played as a striker for Liverpool, Real Madrid, Newcastle United, Manchester United, and Stoke City, as well as the England national team. Since retiring from football in 2013, he has become a racehorse breeder and owner and regularly features as a sports pundit and commentator. Regarded as one of the best strikers of his generation, in 2001 Owen was the recipient of the Ballon d'Or. In 2004, he was named by Pelé in the FIFA 100 list of the world's greatest living players.

The son of former footballer Terry Owen, Owen was born in Chester and began his senior career at Liverpool in 1996. Displaying rapid pace and composed finishing, he progressed through the Liverpool youth team and scored on his Premier League debut in May 1997, becoming the club's youngest goalscorer, at 17 years, 143 days. In his first full season in the Premier League, Owen finished as joint top scorer with 18 goals, sharing the Premier League Golden Boot. He repeated this the following year and was Liverpool's top goal-scorer from 1997 to 2004, gaining his name as a proven goal-scorer despite suffering from a recurring hamstring injury. In 2001, Liverpool won a cup treble of the UEFA Cup, FA Cup (with Owen scoring two late goals in the final) and Football League Cup. He went on to score 118 goals in 216 appearances in the Premier League for Liverpool and 158 goals in 297 total appearances.

After Liverpool had fallen behind their title rivals under Gérard Houllier's final two seasons, Owen opted not to renew his contract and then moved to Real Madrid for £8 million in the summer of 2004. There he was frequently used as a substitute. He scored 13 goals in La Liga before returning to England the following season, where he joined Newcastle United for £16.8 million. This was after Owen's disappointment that Real had rejected a bid from Liverpool to re-sign him. After a promising start to the 2005–06 season, injuries largely ruled him out over the next 18 months. After his return, he became team captain and was the team's top scorer for the 2007–08 season. Newcastle were relegated in the 2008–09 season and, in a surprise move, Owen moved to Manchester United as a free agent. He spent three years at Old Trafford before joining Stoke City in September 2012. Owen is one of ten players to have scored 150 or more goals in the Premier League. He is also the youngest player to have reached 100 goals in the Premier League. On 19 March 2013, Owen announced his retirement from playing at the end of the 2012–13 season.

Internationally, Owen first played for the senior England team in 1998, becoming England's youngest player and youngest goal scorer at the time. His performance at the 1998 FIFA World Cup, which included a goal against Argentina in which he ran from the halfway line, brought him to national and international prominence, making him one of the most sought after players in world football. He went on to score in UEFA Euro 2000, the 2002 World Cup and Euro 2004. He was the first player to have scored in four consecutive major tournaments for England. He played at the 2006 World Cup, but suffered an injury which took him a year to recover from. Occasionally playing as captain, he made 89 appearances for England, scoring 40 goals, of which 26 were in competitive matches, a record for England at the time of his retirement.

== Early life ==
Owen was born in Chester, Cheshire, on 14 December 1979 as the fourth child of Jeanette and Terry Owen. His father is a former professional footballer and played for clubs such as Chester City and Everton. Owen was introduced to football at the age of seven by his father, who soon saw Michael as the most promising athlete in the family. A boyhood Everton fan, Owen attended Rector Drew Primary School in Hawarden, Flintshire, Wales and by the age of ten, some of the nation's leading scouts were monitoring his progress.

At eight, Owen was selected for the Deeside Area Primary School's Under-11 team. At nine, he was captain and, at ten, he had smashed Ian Rush's 20-year record for the same team by scoring 97 goals in a single season, improving on Rush's record by 25 goals. Owen also broke Gary Speed's appearance record having played in all three seasons for the eleven-year-olds since he was eight. Owen turned out for the youth team of Mold Alexandra, playing with the under-10s at the age of eight after a local physical education teacher, Howard Roberts, persuaded the league to allow an under-age player. Owen scored on his debut for Mold Alexandra, a 2–0 victory over local rivals Bagillt. He went on to score 34 goals in 24 games in his first season with Mold Alexandra. After leaving Deeside, Owen attended Hawarden High School, where he also played for the school team.

== Club career ==
=== Liverpool ===
==== 1991–1996: Youth career ====
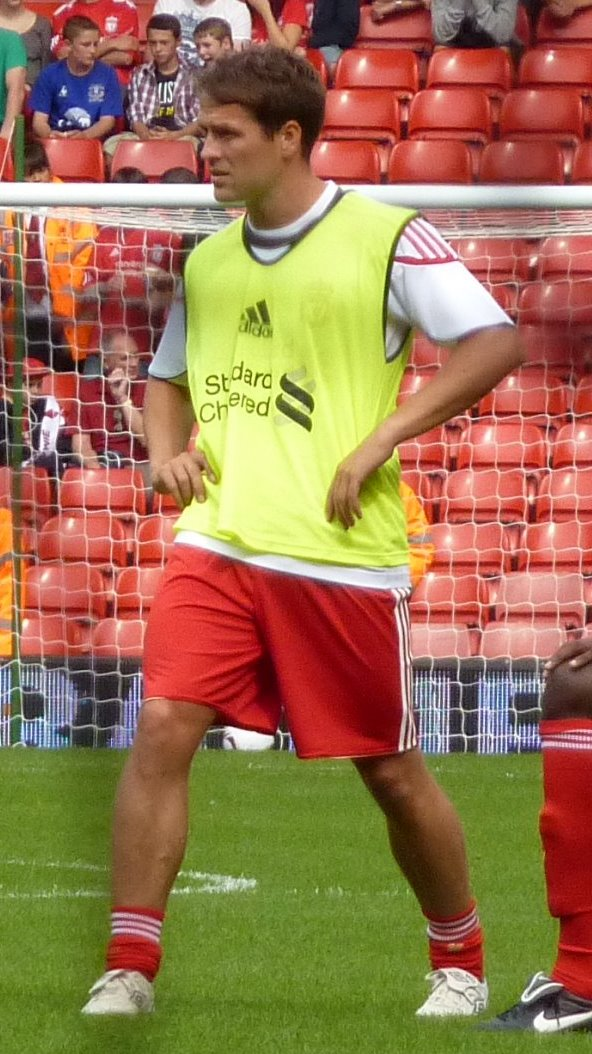
Owen warming up for Liverpool at Anfield before Jamie Carragher's Testimonial Match in 2010

At age 12, when Owen started attending secondary school, he became eligible to sign a schoolboy contract with a club. The first major club to spot him playing for Deeside was Liverpool. Brian Kidd came down from Manchester United and there was also interest from Chelsea and Arsenal. But Steve Heighway, the Liverpool youth development officer, wrote to Owen personally. Terry Owen stated: "[Heighway] wrote us a smashing letter, and it was love at first sight for Michael, he was impressed from day one". Owen subsequently signed with the Liverpool youth team. The club then persuaded Owen to attend the FA's School of Excellence at Lilleshall in Shropshire at age 14. Owen was soon playing for England teams from under-15 upwards, breaking several scoring records with 28 goals in 20 games for the England u-15s and u-16s. Owen also scored prolifically as he rose rapidly through the Anfield youth ranks. Throughout this time, Owen had continued his studies and achieved ten GCSEs. Despite the academic success, Owen was unshakeable, his future was a professional football career with the Liverpool youth team.

In the 1995–96 season, Owen played for Liverpool's youth team even though he was still at Lilleshall. Most of the players were 18, but Owen was only 16. He scored a hat-trick against FA Youth Cup holders Manchester United in the quarter-finals, scoring the winner in extra time. Owen subsequently scored another hat-trick in a 4–2 win in the first leg of the semi against Crystal Palace. Liverpool was 3–0 down after only 50 minutes in the second leg, but with Owen taking control of the match and scoring twice, the team ran out as 7–5 winners. Liverpool faced West Ham United in the final, played over two legs as well. West Ham had not lost in 24 consecutive games, and had future England stars Rio Ferdinand and Frank Lampard. Owen missed the first leg at Upton Park as he was on tour duty with the England under-16 team in the European youth championship in Austria. He returned for the second-leg where Liverpool had fallen behind early against West Ham but Owen equalised with his eleventh goal in five cup matches and Liverpool won the match 2–1. It was the first time Liverpool had won the FA Youth Cup in the club's history and Owen was widely considered the star of the FA Youth Cup campaign.

==== 1996–2000: Breakthrough and prolific goal-scoring ====
Owen celebrated his 17th birthday by signing a professional contract with Liverpool. He was handed a place in Roy Evans' senior squad, with Steve Heighway stating that "[Owen] is ready for whatever you throw at him; nothing fazes Michael Owen. He's ready. If the manager wants a recommendation from me, Michael gets it". Owen also declared his aim was "a first-team place in the next year or so". Karl-Heinz Riedle, who prior to joining Liverpool in the summer of 1997 had never heard of Owen, declared: "It's unbelievable when you see him play to realise that he's only 17 ... He's such a good player, so very quick and for his age he has excellent vision and awareness. He's a great player already and in one or two years he will become a very great player". Owen was rated as "the best attacker of his age in the country" in January 1997. Ted Powell, the championship-winning coach of the England under-18 side, declared Owen to be the best of a generation of young players that included Paul Scholes, David Beckham and Robbie Fowler. On 6 May 1997, Owen scored on his Liverpool debut against Wimbledon at Selhurst Park. Liverpool were league title challengers to Manchester United but their failure to beat Wimbledon in the penultimate game of the league season handed the championship to United. The Liverpool Echo wrote: "[Only] Michael Owen could emerge with any credit from a performance that mocked Anfield's rich traditions". Owen, who had come on as a substitute in the second half, "[breathed] new life into the Reds' championship corpse", and "began [Liverpool's] best spell of the night", but was ultimately not able to salvage a win. The Liverpool Echo stated: "It was a debut marked in the grand manner".

Owen replaced the injured Robbie Fowler as Liverpool's first-choice striker in 1997–98. He won the Premier League Golden Boot and was awarded the PFA Young Player of the Year award. Owen also finished in third place in the PFA Player of the Year voting behind Dennis Bergkamp and Tony Adams. Owen recorded many personal feats during the season and helped Liverpool challenge for the league championship, but ultimately a run of bad form in February saw the club bowing out of the title race. The Liverpool Echo wrote that "[Owen] has become Liverpool's most precious performer and, quite simply, their saviour". Owen signed a five-year contract with Liverpool worth £2.5 million during the season. His £10,000-a-week deal made him the highest-paid teenager in the history of British football. Owen was runner-up to Zinedine Zidane in the World Player of the Year award, also finishing in fourth position in the FIFA World Player of the Year and European Player of the Year international awards. Owen retained the Premier League Golden Boot in 1998–99, despite incurring a hamstring injury against Leeds United that prematurely brought his season to an end on 12 April. With his pace identified as his greatest strength, Liverpool's game had revolved around feeding him with through passes and long balls. Owen constantly moved from static positions to full speed in a matter of split seconds. ESPN wrote: "It [would] eventually [prove] too much for [Owen's] hamstring to handle". Liverpool failed to challenge for the league title that season despite Owen's brilliant form. The club had appointed a new manager in Gérard Houllier and were transitioning out of the Spice Boys era. Owen ended the 1998–99 season as runner-up to Nicolas Anelka in the PFA Young Player of the Year award.

Owen returned to action after almost five months of layoff during the 1999–2000 season. He played intermittently throughout the season and ended up ceding the Golden Boot to Kevin Phillips. He had completed only six full games by January and, during a frustrating spell punctuated by recurring breakdowns, had managed to stay the 90 minutes only three times since mid-October. Owen injured his hamstring once again while playing against Middlesbrough in January. He remained out of action for well over a month and later received treatment from German doctor Hans-Wilhelm Müller-Wohlfahrt. The persistent hamstring problems ended up robbing Liverpool of Owen for a third of a season in which a lack of goals eventually cost them a place in the Champions League.

==== 2000–2002: Ballon d'Or and treble ====
Owen helped Liverpool to a treble in 2000–01, as the team won the League Cup, FA Cup and UEFA Cup to end a six-year trophy drought. Owen was thus the recipient of the Ballon d'Or in recognition of his performances that season. At the time, he became the most recent English winner of the European Footballer of the Year award until Harry Kane won it in 2026, and the first Englishman to win the award since Kevin Keegan in 1979. Owen scored both of Liverpool's goals in their triumph over Arsenal in the 2001 FA Cup Final as they came back from 1–0 down to win 2–1.

Liverpool and Owen challenged for the league championship during the 2001–02 season. The team eventually finished runners-up to Arsenal, with Owen playing a key part in the campaign. On 29 December 2001, Owen scored his 100th goal for Liverpool during the season against West Ham United. He also led them to success in the Charity Shield and the UEFA Super Cup during the start of the season in 2001. Liverpool thus became the first English team to win five trophies in one calendar year. Owen signed a four-year contract worth £70,000-a-week with Liverpool during the season, making him one of the highest earners in the English Premiership. Real Madrid president Florentino Pérez started as early as in March 2002 to pursue Owen. Pérez declared his intentions to make Owen the next Galáctico, stating that "the best players must play for Real Madrid". Liverpool manager Gérard Houllier laughed off any apparent interest, saying: "They might be able to afford Ronaldo but they cannot afford Michael Owen. For that kind of money they could only buy his left foot but he is not going anywhere. Michael is Liverpool through and through, and he is staying with me".

==== 2002–2004: Maintained performances and transfer rumours ====
Owen continued with strong performances in the 2002–03 season, which saw Liverpool top the league table and remain unbeaten for several months. However, a run of disastrous results starting from November and culminating in January saw the team bow out of the title race. Chelsea pipped Liverpool to the fourth and final Champions League spot on the final day of the season. Owen was also controversially overlooked for the PFA Player of the Year award during the season. He had continued establishing personal records with Liverpool and had scored his 100th Premier League goal on 26 April against West Bromwich Albion. Success in the League Cup also meant that Liverpool had ended up with a trophy for a third consecutive season. Owen had scored in the League Cup Final against Manchester United to clinch the trophy for Liverpool. However, Liverpool's failure to qualify for the Champions League led to speculation about Owen's long-term future. Transfer speculation had continued linking him to Real Madrid and Barcelona. Owen was quoted as saying: "I really have to be playing in the Champions League and that is something [Liverpool] have to remedy". Owen would later refute the quote, stating: "Some of the words I never even said and the rest were taken completely out of context". Houllier moved to re-shape the Liverpool squad in 2003 to reassure Owen. He stated: "We want to win the title. This is our vision at Liverpool—and we want to win it with Michael in our team. Michael is a genuine world-class player. He has had a great season and I think he will be even better next season". Bolton Wanderers manager Sam Allardyce was quoted as saying: "Stop Michael Owen scoring and you are 50 per cent towards getting a result at Anfield", while Owen had admitted to being frustrated at the lack of support play from his teammates.

After a shaky start to the 2003–04 season, Liverpool emerged as title contenders once more, with Owen leading the charge. Owen, however, would suffer an ankle injury while playing against Arsenal on 3 October and consequently went through "three months of injury nightmare". Owen only played intermittently over the following months, suffering from niggling ankle and hamstring injuries, while Liverpool's season fell apart. After a goal drought lasting nine games and three months, Owen returned to fitness and scoring form with a goal against Manchester City on 11 February. Owen helped reignite Liverpool's hunt for fourth spot, scoring his 150th goal for Liverpool in the subsequent match against Portsmouth on 15 February, and although suffering from further injuries, ultimately led Liverpool to the fourth and final Champions League spot. Following Gérard Houllier's sacking as Liverpool manager, speculation about Owen's departure from the club began. During the first few Champions League games at the start of the 2004–05 season, Owen sat on the bench to avoid being cup-tied for the Champions League, something that would have meant he would be unable to play in European competitions for any other club that season. Since 1998, Owen had been Liverpool's top scorer every season until he left the club. Real Madrid signed him for a fee of £8 million on 13 August 2004, with midfielder Antonio Núñez moving in the other direction as a make-weight.

=== Real Madrid ===
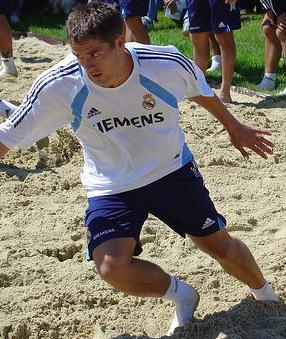
Owen at a training camp with Real Madrid

Following their successful bid, on 14 August 2004, Real Madrid officially presented Owen with the number 11 shirt. Owen joined the club during its Galácticos era, and played alongside the "big four" of preceding star signings, namely Luís Figo, Zinedine Zidane, Ronaldo, and David Beckham, as well as prominent team players from the pre-Galácticos era; Raúl, Roberto Carlos and Iker Casillas. He also became the second Liverpool player to join Real Madrid in five years after Steve McManaman, who played for the club from 1999 to 2003.

Owen was regarded as having a slow start to his Madrid career, often being confined to the bench. Owen sometimes drew criticism from fans and the Spanish press for his lack of form. A successful return to action with the England squad in October 2004 seemed to revive his morale however, and in the first following match, he scored his first goal for the club, the winner in a 1–0 Champions League victory over Dynamo Kyiv. A few days later, he scored his first La Liga goal in a 1–0 victory over Valencia. The scoring spree continued, as he found the back of the net in three of the next four matches to make it five goals in seven matches. On 10 April 2005, Owen scored Real Madrid's fourth goal in a 4–2 El Clásico win over Barcelona at the Santiago Bernabéu Stadium. Owen ended the 2004–05 season with 13 goals in La Liga, with the season's highest ratio of goals scored to number of minutes played. Following Madrid's signing of two high-profile Brazilian forwards, Robinho and Júlio Baptista, in the summer of 2005, the speculation arose that Owen would return to the Premier League. During his time at Real Madrid, Owen scored 16 goals from 45 games, 26 of which were starts.

=== Newcastle United ===
==== 2005–2007: Club record transfer and injuries ====
On 24 August 2005, Newcastle United announced that they had agreed to a club record fee of £16.8 million to obtain Owen, although they still had to negotiate with the player's advisers. Liverpool and local rivals Everton entered the fray, but were unwilling to match Madrid's asking price. As the 2006 World Cup was less than a year away, Owen wanted to get more playing time to secure his position as the first-choice striker in the England squad and joined Newcastle amid rumours that he had inserted an escape clause valued at £12 million. On 31 August 2005, Owen signed a four-year contract to play for Newcastle, despite initial press speculation that he would rather have returned to Liverpool. Some 20,000 fans were present at Newcastle's home ground of St James' Park for Owen's official unveiling as a Newcastle player. Several days after signing, he suffered a thigh-injury in pre-season, which ruled him out for the start of the 2005–06 season. He scored his first goal for the club on his second appearance, the second goal in a 3–0 away win at Blackburn Rovers on 18 September, Newcastle's first win of the season. Owen scored his first hat-trick for Newcastle in the 4–2 away win over West Ham United on 17 December. It was also a "perfect hat trick", with one goal scored with each of his left foot, right foot and head.

On 31 December 2005, Owen broke a metatarsal bone in his foot in a match against Tottenham Hotspur. He underwent surgery to place a pin in the bone, to help speed the healing process. He was expected to be out of action until late March, but the healing process did not go as hoped and on 24 March he underwent a second, minor operation. Owen then stated that he should be fit for the final few weeks of the season with Newcastle. His return to action finally came against Birmingham City on 29 April when he came off the substitutes' bench in the 62nd minute. After the match, Owen stated that he was "not 100% happy" with his foot. He underwent a further X-ray and made himself unavailable for Newcastle's final game of the season. A damaged anterior cruciate ligament (ACL) in his right knee, sustained in the first minute of the group match against Sweden at the 2006 FIFA World Cup, kept Owen out of regular football for nearly a year, until April 2007. The seriousness of Owen's injury at the World Cup inflamed the so-called "club-versus-country" row in England, centring on the liability of the world governing body FIFA and The Football Association (FA) for the cost of injuries to players incurred while on international duty. Newcastle were aggrieved at the length of time Owen would now be out of action in forthcoming Premier League and Cup competitions as a result of the World Cup injury, particularly as he had been out for the half-season prior to the World Cup. Under the existing insurance arrangements between club and country, FIFA and the FA had been paying £50,000 of Owen's £110,000 weekly wages since he suffered the injury, totalling approximately £2 million for the time he was out of action. By September 2006, Newcastle were threatening to sue the FA for further compensation, for a reported figure of £20 million. The Owen case was a high-profile follow-up to an already ongoing legal claim for compensation from FIFA over an injury incurred by Abdelmajid Oulmers on international duty. Newcastle's compensation claim included the £10 million cost of buying Owen's replacement, Obafemi Martins, £6.2 million towards Owen's salary costs while injured, the possibility of long-term damage to Owen's fitness and ability, the loss of league position and cup competition progress, depreciation of Owen's four-year contract, and the cost of medical treatment for Owen. In February 2007, FIFA made Newcastle a "final offer" of £1 million. By April 2007, Newcastle were threatening to take out an injunction to stop the FA from picking Owen for England games. The club finally reached a compromise settlement figure with FIFA and the FA; FIFA indicated that the settlement was between £6 million and £7 million. The club, stating that Owen's wages had "now been paid in full", stated the overall compensation achieved totalled £10 million. Resulting from the Owen compensation claim, the FA doubled their future insurance coverage of England players to £100,000, and FIFA introduced a compensation fund for injuries sustained at World Cups.

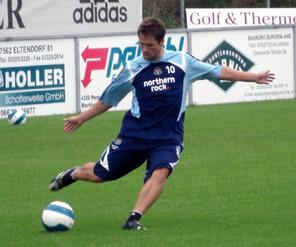
Owen training with Newcastle in 2007

Owen began light training on 12 February 2007, when pictures on the club's official website highlighted Owen running and carrying out minor exercises. He made his comeback from injury on 10 April 2007 in a 4–1 behind-closed-doors friendly against Gretna, scoring after ten minutes and then setting up fellow striker Shola Ameobi before coming off an hour later. Owen then started his first game for Newcastle in over a year, a 1–0 loss against Reading on 30 April 2007. He played the full 90 minutes, having a goal disallowed for offside. Owen was stretchered off an hour into Newcastle's game with Watford on 13 May 2007, suffering concussion after colliding with teammate Matty Pattison. On 9 May 2007, Newcastle chairman Freddy Shepherd reacted angrily to reports that Owen could move on to another club at the end of the 2006–07 season due to a release clause in his contract. A report in The Times newspaper suggested Owen could be available for less than £10 million and could be a target for the likes of Chelsea, Manchester United, Liverpool and Arsenal. Despite these reports, Shepherd warned Owen "to show some loyalty" and warned him that "none of the big four clubs want him". In a video posted on YouTube, however, a group of Liverpool fans asked Shepherd if they could re-sign Owen, he responded by saying that he would "carry Owen back to Liverpool" himself. Shepherd also stated his dislike of Owen's agent, but praised Owen as a "good lad". This led many to believe that Owen would exercise his right to leave if the £9 million valuation was matched. On 10 June 2007, Owen's new manager at Newcastle, Sam Allardyce, confirmed the existence of the release clause in Owen's contract and said he feared that the club would be powerless to prevent Owen from leaving. On 12 July 2007, however, Owen committed his immediate future to Newcastle, stating: "I believe that these can be good times to be at Newcastle, which is why I am more than happy to be here".

==== 2007–2009: Declined form and injuries ====
On 17 July 2007, he scored for Newcastle in a pre-season friendly against Hartlepool United. Several days later, Owen picked up a thigh injury in training. Newcastle manager Sam Allardyce said that Owen was likely to miss the start of the forthcoming Premier League season due to the injury, which "doesn't look as encouraging as we first thought". Owen made his comeback from injury in a club friendly on 13 August 2007 and declared himself available for Newcastle's next match, against Aston Villa, as well as England's forthcoming international matches. On 29 August 2007, Owen scored his first competitive goal for Newcastle since December 2005 when he scored in the League Cup against Barnsley. Three days later, he scored in the league with a late winner against Wigan Athletic. In late September 2007, after an encouraging start to the season playing for both Newcastle and England, it was reported that he would urgently require an operation for a double hernia and would likely be out of action for at least a month. In his first match back from the hernia operation, he scored a late goal coming off the substitutes bench to clinch victory for Newcastle over Everton. In November 2007, Owen suffered a thigh strain while on international duty, ruling him out for six weeks. This reignited the "club or country" row, with then Newcastle manager Sam Allardyce voicing his disappointment that Owen was risked in a low-key friendly game against Austria. After over three months without a goal, Owen scored the first goal of the second Kevin Keegan era in a 4–1 FA Cup third round replay win over Stoke City on 16 January 2008, although Keegan was only a spectator in the stands for this game. Owen was awarded the captaincy by Keegan on 19 January 2008. He scored his first league goal of 2008 on 3 February. Owen's goal in the 2–0 defeat of Fulham on 22 March 2008, which marked Newcastle's first win under Keegan's second spell as manager, also marked the first time in his Newcastle career that Owen had scored more goals for Newcastle than against them. By 5 April 2008, after his and the team's early season poor form, Owen had scored six goals in the previous six matches, with Newcastle registering four wins and two draws, lifting Newcastle into mid-table after earlier relegation fears. In the final game of the season, Owen scored in a 3–1 loss at Everton, finishing with 11 goals in total, putting him in equal 13th position for Premier League goals for the 2007–08 season.

Owen missed all of the pre-season matches and training of the 2008–09 season due to a bout of mumps, which also kept him out of the international friendlies with the USA and Trinidad and Tobago in May 2008. He also suffered a calf strain during the summer months, which kept him out of the opening game of the season against Manchester United at Old Trafford, a game in which Newcastle drew 1–1. He made his return in the second game of the season against Bolton Wanderers on 23 August 2008, coming on in the 53rd minute for the injured Obafemi Martins. He scored the winning header in the 71st minute, with the game finishing 1–0. Three days later, he was named on the bench in a League Cup match away to Coventry City, he came on as a substitute and scored the winner in extra time in a 2–3 victory. In the 2008–09 season, he featured more consistently than in prior seasons, scoring four goals in twelve league appearances. Under the transfer rules, with the 2008–09 season being the final year of his contract with Newcastle, Owen would have been allowed to sign a pre-contract agreement with other clubs during January. On 22 December 2008, Owen rejected a new contract offer from Newcastle, but stated that he would not be seeking a move in the January transfer window and instead intended to postpone talks over his contract situation until the end of the season. With speculation over his future continuing in the second half of the season, Owen received "substantial damages" in June in the High Court in London and a public apology following a story on 15 May in the Daily Express alleging that due to a lack of interest from Premier League clubs, Owen's career was effectively finished and he intended to retire.

After a disastrous season in general for the club, which culminated in Owen's former Newcastle and England teammate Alan Shearer being brought in as a temporary manager for the final eight games of the season. Owen's alleged refusal to play in this run, including a crucial home game against Fulham proved costly, as on the final day of the season on 24 May 2009, Newcastle were relegated from the Premier League for the first time in 15 years. On 14 June, it was reported that Owen's management company Wasserman Media Group had sent out a 34-page brochure advertising Owen to several potential clubs. On 22 June, Owen confirmed he would not be re-signing for Newcastle, in preference for a move to a Premier League club, or another top-flight foreign club. It was reported that Owen would not begin negotiations with any other club until after 30 June when, on expiry of his contract, he would become eligible for a free transfer. In September 2019, Owen stated that he regretted his move to Newcastle and that he had hoped for a return to Liverpool.

=== Manchester United ===
==== 2009–2010: Debut season ====
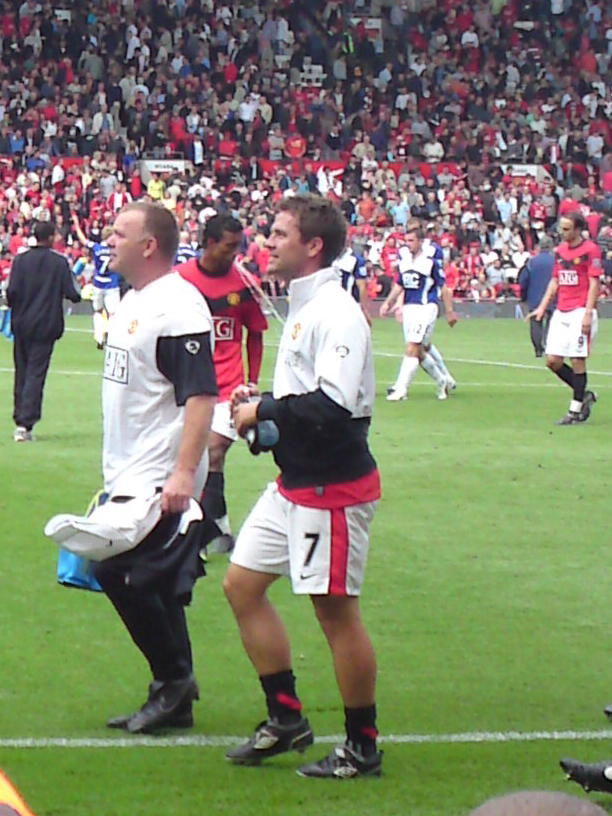
Owen (wearing No.7) on his Manchester United début against Birmingham City, 16 August 2009.

On 3 July 2009, it was announced that Owen had signed a two-year deal with Manchester United arch rivals of Liverpool. A surprise move, Owen said that the approach from manager Alex Ferguson was "out of the blue". He signed a pay-as-you-play deal and was handed the number 7 shirt vacated by the departure of Cristiano Ronaldo to Real Madrid. The shirt had previously been worn by many of United's other illustrious players over the years, including Johnny Berry, George Best, Steve Coppell, Bryan Robson, Eric Cantona and David Beckham.

Owen scored his first goal for United on his debut, scoring an 84th-minute winner after coming on as a substitute in a pre-season friendly against a Malaysian XI; he followed this up by scoring three more goals in United's pre-season games. Owen made his league debut for United when he came on as a substitute against Birmingham City on 16 August in a 1–0 win, and scored his first competitive goal in a Manchester United shirt against Wigan Athletic on 22 August in a 5–0 away win. On 20 September, Owen scored his first goal at Old Trafford, in the sixth minute of stoppage time against local rivals Manchester City to give United a 4–3 derby win. This meant that Owen had now scored in his third derby, after scoring in the Merseyside derby, and the Tyne–Wear derby in previous years. Owen struggled to recall the moments immediately after the goal, and said that it ranked as one of his most important.

On 27 October, Owen scored a goal in the 2–0 away win against Barnsley to qualify United past the fourth round of the League Cup. On 3 November, Owen scored his first Champions League goal for Manchester United, as he grabbed United's first in the 3–3 draw against CSKA Moscow. Owen's seemingly slim chances of earning a place in Fabio Capello's England squad for the 2010 World Cup finals in 2010 received a boost when on 8 December 2009, Owen scored his first hat-trick for Manchester United in a 3–1 away win against VfL Wolfsburg in the Champions League, his first hat-trick since 2005. On 28 February 2010, Owen scored United's first goal in their 2–1 victory over Aston Villa in the 2010 League Cup final, but had to be substituted after pulling up on 42 minutes. Originally thought to be a minor injury, on 5 March it was announced Owen required surgery on his hamstring, ruling him out for the rest of the season.

==== 2010–2011: Premier League title ====
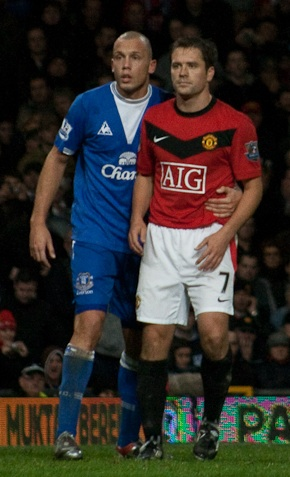
Owen (right) playing for Manchester United, with Everton's John Heitinga.

Owen scored his first goal for United back from injury in a 7–1 pre-season victory against a League of Ireland XI on 4 August 2010 at the newly built Aviva Stadium. On 22 September 2010, Owen scored twice during a 5–2 away win over Scunthorpe United in the third round of the League Cup, his first goals of the season. Four days later, Owen scored his first league goal of the season, United's second equaliser with his first touch in a 2–2 away draw against Bolton Wanderers. Owen's first goal of 2011 came in United's 2–1 FA Cup victory over Southampton at St Mary's Stadium on 29 January. On 25 February, United manager Alex Ferguson said that Owen was a key part of his squad for the rest of the season. However, he suffered a groin injury and missed his team's next four games. His return match was on 19 March when he returned to the bench for United's game against Bolton.

By the time of United's penultimate game of the season, he had reached the number of league appearances required for a title winner's medal—his first in 15 seasons as a professional. The game, on 14 May 2011, only required United to draw with Blackburn Rovers at Ewood Park to win the title, and a 1–1 draw secured it for them. Owen was an unused substitute in the game. Owen scored United's final goal in their last league game of the season, at home to Blackpool, in which the Red Devils won 4–2. Owen was an unused substitute in United's Champions League final defeat to Barcelona, marking the end of his season. He signed a one-year extension to his contract on 1 June 2011.

==== 2011–2012: Limited appearances ====
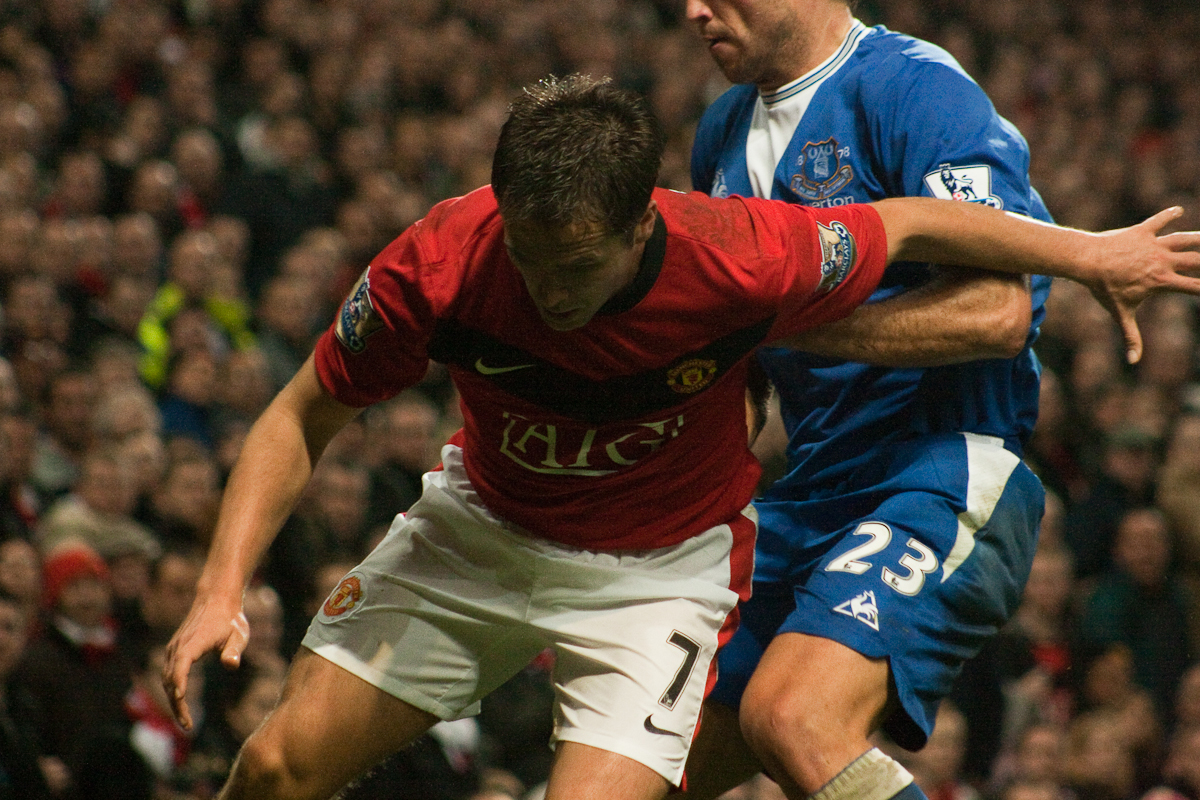
Owen defended by Lucas Neill of Everton

Owen started his first game of the season in the third round of the League Cup against Leeds United. He scored two goals in the first half, helping United to progress to the fourth round with a 3–0 win. His first goal came after he advanced to the box and scuffed a shot into the corner of the net. The second goal came on the half-hour mark, when he met Mame Biram Diouf's cross with instant control before firing a right-foot shot into the top. Owen started his second game of the season in the fourth round of the League Cup, against League Two club Aldershot Town. He scored the second goal of the 3–0 win. Dimitar Berbatov completed a run down the right flank before pulling the ball back into the box, with Owen scoring past Ross Worner.

Owen started in United's home Champions League group stage match against Oțelul Galați on 2 November; however, he was substituted early in the first half when he pulled up with a thigh injury; this was his last appearance for the team. In February 2012, Owen started light training with the Manchester United squad. From April 2012, Owen started full training but was not yet ready for first team games. On 13 May 2012, Owen was named as a substitute against Sunderland in United's final fixture, but he was not brought on. On 17 May 2012, Owen announced on Twitter that Manchester United would not be offering him a new deal, ending his three-year association with the club.

=== Stoke City ===
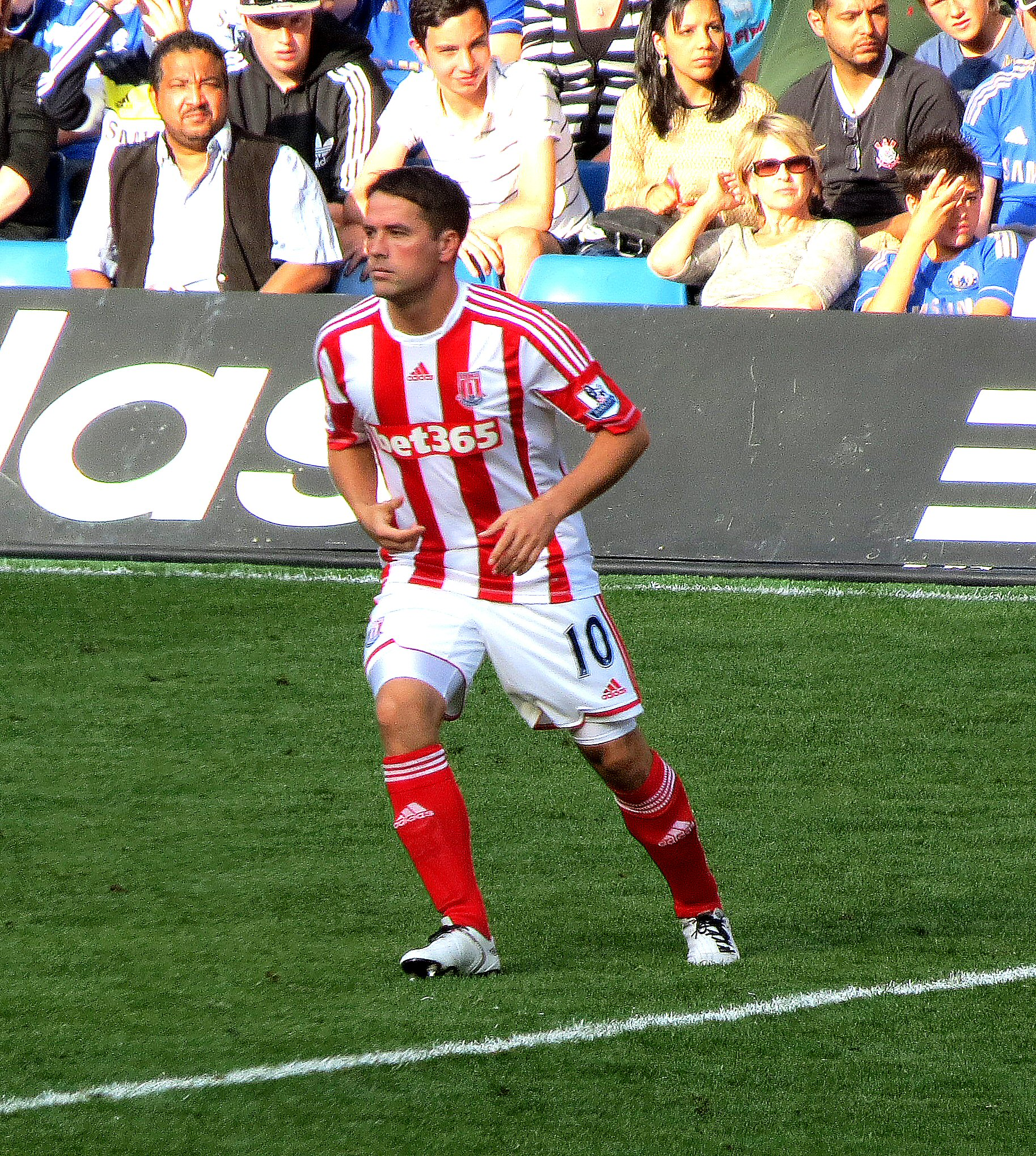
Owen playing for Stoke City in a Premier League match on 22 September 2012 against Chelsea

On 4 September 2012, Owen joined Stoke City on a one-year contract. He was handed the number 10 shirt from the departed Ricardo Fuller and made his debut in a 1–1 draw against Manchester City on 15 September. The start to his time at Stoke was hampered by a hamstring injury. Owen scored his first and only goal for Stoke on 19 January 2013 in a 3–1 defeat at Swansea City, his first goal since 25 October 2011. In doing so, he became only the seventh player to reach 150 Premier League goals.

On 19 March 2013, Owen announced that he would retire from playing at the end of the 2012–13 season. He was restricted to just eight Premier League appearances for Stoke, all coming from the substitutes' bench, including in his final appearance on 19 May 2013 against Southampton, where he received a standing ovation from both sets of supporters.

Owen had indicated that he would like to become involved with Chester in some capacity when he retires, as it was his local team growing up and his father played for the old Chester side which went out of business in March 2010 and was reformed at a lower level.

== International career ==
"He is in the top four of our greatest finishers, along with Jimmy Greaves, Gary Lineker and Alan Shearer. Some might say he is at the top of that list. He was a baby-faced assassin. His finishing was amazing for a young man".

— Glenn Hoddle

Owen was capped 89 times for England and scored 40 goals. He is sixth in the list of all-time top scorers for the England team, behind Harry Kane (61), Wayne Rooney (53), Bobby Charlton (49), Gary Lineker (48) and Jimmy Greaves (44). His 89 caps also place him as England's eleventh most capped player.

Owen played for England at the 1998, 2002 and 2006 FIFA World Cups and the 2000 and 2004 UEFA European Championships. He scored goals in all but one of these tournaments, making him the first player ever to have scored in four major tournaments for England.

=== Emergence ===
Owen had a highly successful record at Youth level, playing for the England under-20 team at the 1997 FIFA World Youth Championship and scoring three goals in four games. He played once for the England under-21 team, scoring in a win over Greece at Carrow Road.

He made his debut for the England senior team in a 2–0 friendly loss to Chile on 11 February 1998. This made Owen the youngest player to represent England in the 20th century at 18 years and 59 days of age.

Owen's youthful enthusiasm, pace and talent made him a popular player across the country, and many fans were keen for him to be selected for the 1998 World Cup in France. In a pre-World Cup friendly against Morocco, Owen scored his first goal for England. The goal also made him the youngest ever player to have scored for England, until his record was surpassed by Wayne Rooney in 2003.

=== 1998 World Cup ===
"For me [Michael Owen was] the only good thing to come out of the '98 World Cup. Speed, cunning, balls". — Diego Maradona on Owen's performance in the 1998 World Cup.

Owen was selected for the World Cup squad by manager Glenn Hoddle, becoming England's youngest ever player at a World Cup when he came on as a substitute in the opening match against Tunisia. In the following match, a 2–1 defeat to Romania, Owen again appeared as a substitute. His equalising goal made him England's youngest ever goalscorer in the tournament at the age of 18 years and 190 days. In stoppage time, he hit the post with a long range shot, almost salvaging a point from the game. Because of his impact against Romania, Hoddle selected Owen in the starting line-up for England's decisive group match against Colombia. England won the match, and Owen retained his place for the second round match against Argentina. After Argentina had taken a sixth-minute lead, Owen was fouled in the penalty area by Roberto Ayala and Alan Shearer equalised with the penalty kick. In the 16th minute, Owen gave England a 2–1 lead with a sensational individual goal. After beating defenders Ayala and José Chamot, he struck the ball past goalkeeper Carlos Roa. In 2013, the goal was voted as the third-greatest in England's history. England eventually drew the match and went out of the tournament on penalties, with Owen successfully converting his kick. At the end of the year, he won a public vote to be elected winner of the prestigious BBC Sports Personality of the Year title.

=== Euro 2000 ===
Owen started the UEFA Euro 2000 qualifying phase as a regular in the England starting line-up. However, injury problems meant he missed much of the campaign as England struggled, with Hoddle being replaced by Kevin Keegan. On 4 September 1999, he scored his first goal at Wembley Stadium in a 6–0 win over Luxembourg. At the finals, Owen scored once in three matches, as England were knocked out at the group stage, after losing again to Romania.

=== 2002 World Cup ===
"You know that if he is on the pitch, there is always the chance to win until the last second of the game. There are so many good memories of Michael and my relationship with him as coach, but it must be scoring three goals against Germany away. I never thought about that, but I wonder now how many players have scored three goals in Germany away? That can't be many".

— Sven-Göran Eriksson

After Alan Shearer's retirement, Owen took over as England's senior striker under new manager Sven-Göran Eriksson. He scored six times during 2002 World Cup qualifying, including a hat-trick against Germany at Munich's Olympiastadion, as England won the qualifying group. His performances saw him named European Footballer of the Year for 2001.

In April 2002, he was named as England's captain for a friendly match against Paraguay in place of the injured regular captain David Beckham. Owen was the youngest England captain since Bobby Moore in 1963, and in the following few seasons, he regularly deputised for Beckham as Eriksson's vice-captain.

At the 2002 World Cup finals, Owen failed to score during the group stage. However, he was fouled for England's match winning penalty kick in the 1–0 win over Argentina. Owen scored in England's second round match against Denmark and then gave England an early lead in the 2–1 quarter-final defeat against Brazil.

=== Euro 2004 ===
Owen scored five times in qualification for Euro 2004.

At the tournament proper, Owen again failed to score during the group stage. He then scored in the third minute of the quarter-final with Portugal, becoming the first England player to score in four consecutive major tournaments. England went on to lose on penalties after a 2–2 draw.

=== 2006 World Cup ===
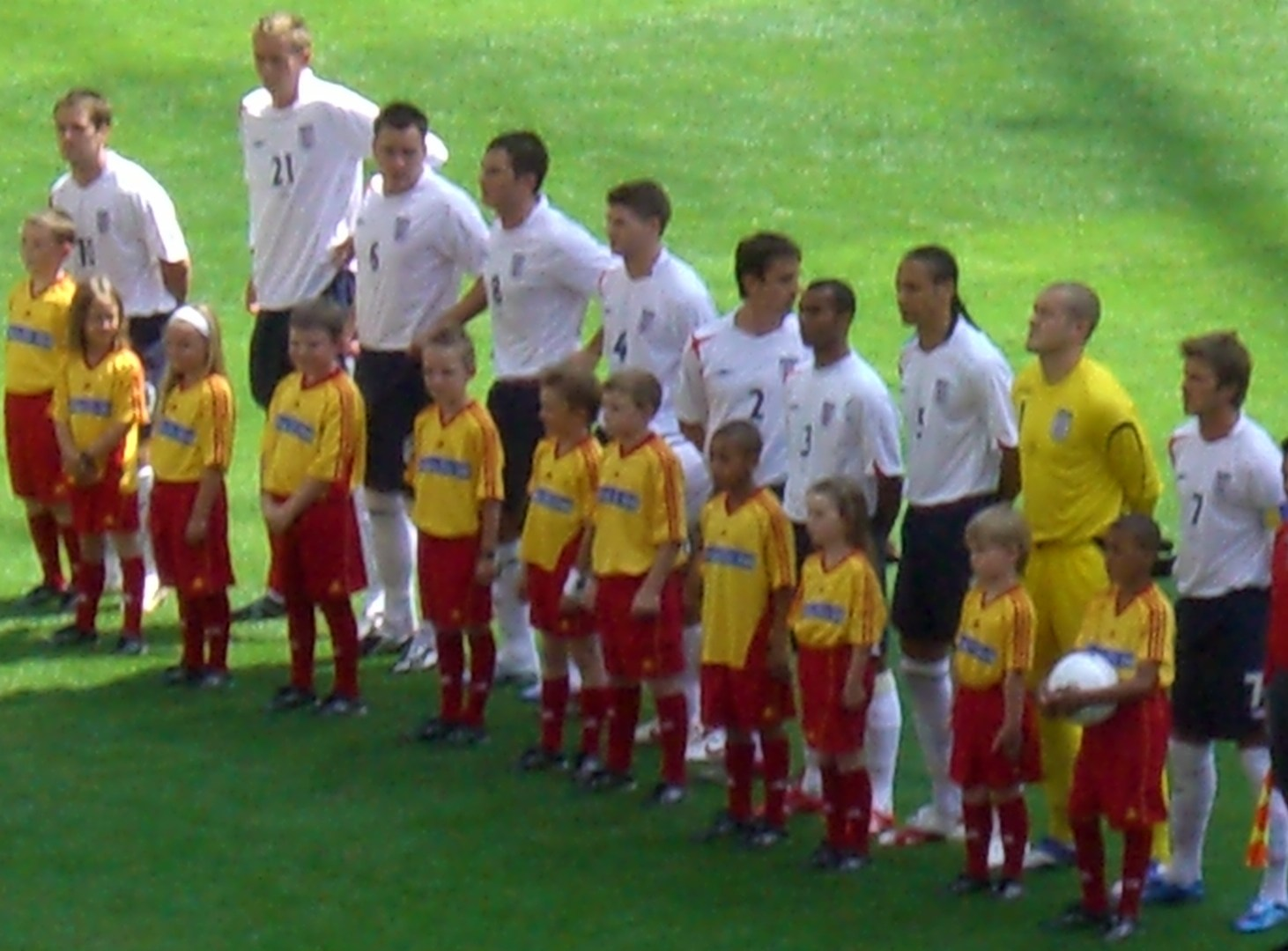
Owen (wearing No.10) lining up for England against Paraguay at the 2006 FIFA World Cup.

In qualification for the 2006 World Cup, Owen scored five goals.

In May 2005, he scored his second international hat-trick in a friendly match against Colombia at Giants Stadium. In another pre-World Cup friendly, Owen scored two late goals to give England a 3–2 win over rivals Argentina in November 2005.

Owen made his debut for the England B-team in a friendly against Belarus on 25 May 2006, as part of his return to match fitness ahead of the 2006 World Cup. He captained England B in this game, playing for 61 minutes before being substituted.

Owen started England's first two games of the 2006 World Cup, against Paraguay and Trinidad and Tobago, but did not manage to score. After playing only 51 seconds of his third appearance of the tournament, and 80th cap, in the final group game against Sweden, Owen badly twisted his right knee and was forced to leave the match on a stretcher. A scan of the injury on 21 June confirmed that Owen had torn the anterior cruciate ligament (ACL) in his knee, and was sent home, no longer able to play in the tournament. In March 2009, Owen admitted that all injuries he was sustaining were relating back to his injury in the 2006 World Cup tournament, and that he should not have returned prematurely from injury to participate in the competition.

=== Final appearances ===
Owen underwent successful reconstruction surgery, carried out by Richard Steadman, on 6 September 2006. The injury sidelined him until April 2007, meaning he missed England's first six matches in qualifying for Euro 2008. He returned for the England B game against Albania, and was named in the full squad for the first England match at the new Wembley Stadium against Brazil and the Euro 2008 qualifier against Estonia, with Owen stating "I feel sharp and, if given the chance, I feel confident when in front of goal". He played in both matches and scored against Estonia, breaking Gary Lineker's record for most goals in competitive internationals for England.

On 12 September 2007, Owen scored twice for England in a 3–0 win over Russia, becoming the first player to score international goals at both the old and new Wembley Stadiums. These were to be Owen's final goals for England.

After England failed to qualify for Euro 2008, manager Steve McClaren was replaced by Fabio Capello. Owen made only one appearance under Capello, as a substitute in a friendly against France in March 2008.

== Style of play ==
In his prime, Owen was highly regarded for his great pace, opportunism and agility, as well as his technical ability and his eye for goal, which resulted in him being considered one of the greatest English and Premier League strikers of his generation. A prolific goalscorer, Owen was a powerful and accurate finisher, who was also effective with his head, despite his lack of height. He was also capable of linking up with and creating chances for teammates due to his short passing ability and vision. Despite, or even due to, his precocious talent in his youth, Owen faced many injuries throughout his career, which in later years affected his pace, fitness, mobility and the overall consistency of his performances. His former Liverpool and England teammate Steven Gerrard has labelled Owen as the best teenage footballer he has ever seen, describing him as being even better as a teenager than Lamine Yamal and Kylian Mbappé.

== Personal life ==
Owen met Louise Bonsall at primary school in 1984. The couple bought Lower Soughton Manor near Mold, Flintshire, north Wales, where they keep his cars and her horses. They were engaged on 14 February 2004, and married on 24 June 2005, at the Carden Park Hotel in Chester, Cheshire. The couple had initially planned to get married at their home, but changed plans when they were informed that if a licence was granted for a marriage ceremony the venue must be made available for other weddings for three years, so opted to marry in a register office in informal clothing and have a lavish reception the next day in the grounds of their home.

Their daughter, Gemma Rose, was born on 1 May 2003. On 6 February 2006, they had a son named James Michael. Their third child, a daughter, Emily May, was born on 29 October 2007. Their fourth child Jessica was born on 26 February 2010. Owen revealed in January 2024 that his son James had been diagnosed with Stargardt disease, a degenerative eye condition, when he was eight years old.

After Owen returned to England to play for Newcastle, he travelled to a nearby BAE Systems facility on a daily basis in order to fly, by helicopter, to train with his club. However, there is now a helipad installed within the grounds of the house to accommodate Owen's Eurocopter Dauphin, with which he both travels and is training to become a pilot. Owen was eventually banned from training to be a pilot by Newcastle United due to excessive insurance premiums.

Owen bought multiple houses on one street for his extended family in Ewloe, which is in an area close to where he used to live.

In 2004, Owen's sister Karen was assaulted by two youths, who attempted to kidnap her. When she revealed that she was pregnant, they fled.

Owen owns several cars and a helicopter and enjoys horse racing and gambling. He owns many race horses, trained by Tom Dascombe. He bred the horse Brown Panther which won a major race at Royal Ascot in 2011, and the 2015 Dubai Gold Cup. On 24 November 2017, Owen rode on Calder Prince at Ascot and finished second, beaten by Tom Chatfield-Roberts on Golden Wedding. He was one of 10 amateur riders to take part in the seven-furlong 'Prince's Countryside Fund Charity' contest, which was attended by Prince Charles and Duchess of Cornwall. Owen was a brand ambassador for British bookmaker Colossus Bets.

=== Media career ===
Owen starred in a series of commercials that charted his life and rise to fame. In 2001, he was the advertising face of breakfast cereal "Nestlé Sporties". He also appeared in several commercials for the washing powder Persil, in a contract worth £1 million. Owen was selected as one of the two cover athletes for Pro Evolution Soccer 2008, alongside Cristiano Ronaldo. He has been an ambassador of the Swiss watchmaker Tissot since 1998 and has a contract with car manufacturer Jaguar.

Following his retirement from football, Owen has worked as a pundit on football broadcasts, currently appearing for TNT Sports (formerly BT Sport) and Amazon Prime Video.

Owen also starred as himself in the children's television drama show Hero to Zero. In the programme, Owen would emerge from a full-size poster of himself in Charlie Brice's room to offer advice in times of crisis.

In January 2018, Owen participated in And They're Off! in aid of Sport Relief, winning the episode.

In January 2022, Owen appeared on the third series of The Masked Singer as "Doughnuts". He was the seventh to be unmasked.

In June 2022, his oldest daughter Gemma, 19, took part in series 8 of ITV reality show Love Island, where she finished in second place.

=== Controversies ===
In June 2021, Owen was exposed for sexting and soliciting nude photographs from former reality television personality and politician Rebecca Jane, as well as arranging to meet with her at a horse-racing event despite his marital status.

In May 2022, cryptocasino Punt announced Owen as their most recent global brand ambassador. Following this, in June 2022, Owen was found to have breached UK laws regarding gambling advertising, as he had used his Twitter account to promote an unlicenced cryptocurrency casino to the British public. He was instructed by the Advertising Standards Authority (ASA) to delete the promotions for the non-fungible token scheme, which breached rules about advertising cryptocurrency gambling products.

== Career statistics ==
=== Club ===
Appearances and goals by club, season and competition
Club	Season	League			National cup (Note: Includes Copa del Rey, FA Cup)		League cup		Europe		Other		Total	
Club	Season	Division	Apps	Goals	Apps	Goals	Apps	Goals	Apps	Goals	Apps	Goals	Apps	Goals
Liverpool	1996–97	Premier League	2	1	0	0	0	0	0	0	—		2	1
Liverpool	1997–98	Premier League	36	18	0	0	4	4	4 (Note: Appearances in UEFA Cup)	1	—		44	23
Liverpool	1998–99	Premier League	30	18	2	2	2	1	6	2	—		40	23
Liverpool	1999–2000	Premier League	27	11	1	0	2	1	—		—		30	12
Liverpool	2000–01	Premier League	28	16	5	3	2	1	11	4	—		46	24
Liverpool	2001–02	Premier League	29	19	2	2	0	0	10 (Note: Appearances in UEFA Champions League)	5	2 (Note: One appearance in UEFA Super Cup, one in Charity Shield)	2	43	28
Liverpool	2002–03	Premier League	35	19	2	0	4	2	12 (Note: Six appearances and four goals in UEFA Champions League, six appearances and three goals in UEFA Cup)	7	1 (Note: Appearance in FA Community Shield)	0	54	28
Liverpool	2003–04	Premier League	29	16	3	1	0	0	6	2	—		38	19
Liverpool	Total		216	118	15	8	14	9	49	21	3	2	297	158
Real Madrid	2004–05	La Liga	36	13	4	2	—		5	1	—		45	16
Newcastle United	2005–06	Premier League	11	7	0	0	0	0	0	0	—		11	7
Newcastle United	2006–07	Premier League	3	0	0	0	0	0	0	0	—		3	0
Newcastle United	2007–08	Premier League	29	11	3	1	1	1	—		—		33	13
Newcastle United	2008–09	Premier League	28	8	2	0	2	2	—		—		32	10
Newcastle United	Total		71	26	5	1	3	3	0	0	—		79	30
Manchester United	2009–10	Premier League	19	3	1	0	4	2	6	4	1	0	31	9
Manchester United	2010–11	Premier League	11	2	2	1	1	2	2	0	1	0	17	5
Manchester United	2011–12	Premier League	1	0	0	0	2	3	1	0	0	0	4	3
Manchester United	Total		31	5	3	1	7	7	9	4	2	0	52	17
Stoke City	2012–13	Premier League	8	1	1	0	0	0	—		—		9	1
Total			362	163	28	12	24	19	63	26	5	2	482	222

=== International ===
Appearances and goals by national team and year
National team	Year	Apps	Goals
England	1998	12	4
England	1999	6	1
England	2000	6	3
England	2001	8	6
England	2002	12	5
England	2003	9	5
England	2004	13	4
England	2005	9	7
England	2006	5	1
England	2007	8	4
England	2008	1	0
Total		89	40

Scores and results list England's goal tally first, score column indicates score after each Owen goal.

List of international goals scored by Michael Owen
No.	Date	Venue	Opponent	Score	Result	Competition
1	27 May 1998	Stade Mohammed V, Casablanca	Morocco	1–0	1–0	1998 King Hassan II International Cup Tournament
2	22 June 1998	Stadium de Toulouse, Toulouse	Romania	1–1	1–2	1998 FIFA World Cup
3	30 June 1998	Stade Geoffroy-Guichard, Saint-Étienne	Argentina	2–1	2–2 (3–4p)	1998 FIFA World Cup
4	14 October 1998	Stade Josy Barthel, Luxembourg City	Luxembourg	1–0	3–0	UEFA Euro 2000 qualifying
5	4 September 1999	Wembley Stadium, London	Luxembourg	6–0	6–0	UEFA Euro 2000 qualifying
6	27 May 2000	Wembley Stadium, London	Brazil	1–0	1–1	Friendly
7	20 June 2000	Stade du Pays de Charleroi, Charleroi	Romania	2–1	2–3	UEFA Euro 2000
8	2 September 2000	Stade de France, Saint-Denis	France	1–1	1–1	Friendly
9	24 March 2001	Anfield, Liverpool	Finland	1–1	2–1	2002 FIFA World Cup qualification
10	28 March 2001	Qemal Stafa Stadium, Tirana	Albania	1–0	3–1	2002 FIFA World Cup qualification
11	1 September 2001	Olympiastadion, Munich	Germany	1–1	5–1	2002 FIFA World Cup qualification
12	1 September 2001	Olympiastadion, Munich	Germany	3–1	5–1	2002 FIFA World Cup qualification
13	1 September 2001	Olympiastadion, Munich	Germany	4–1	5–1	2002 FIFA World Cup qualification
14	5 September 2001	St James' Park, Newcastle	Albania	1–0	2–0	2002 FIFA World Cup qualification
15	17 April 2002	Anfield, Liverpool	Paraguay	1–0	4–0	Friendly
16	21 May 2002	Jeju World Cup Stadium, Seogwipo	South Korea	1–0	1–1	Friendly
17	15 June 2002	Niigata Stadium, Niigata	Denmark	2–0	3–0	2002 FIFA World Cup
18	21 June 2002	Shizuoka Stadium, Shizuoka	Brazil	1–0	1–2	2002 FIFA World Cup
19	12 October 2002	Tehelné pole, Bratislava	Slovakia	2–1	2–1	UEFA Euro 2004 qualifying
20	29 March 2003	Rheinpark Stadion, Vaduz	Liechtenstein	1–0	2–0	UEFA Euro 2004 qualifying
21	11 June 2003	Riverside Stadium, Middlesbrough	Slovakia	1–1	2–1	UEFA Euro 2004 qualifying
22	11 June 2003	Riverside Stadium, Middlesbrough	Slovakia	2–1	2–1	UEFA Euro 2004 qualifying
23	20 August 2003	Portman Road, Ipswich	Croatia	2–0	3–1	Friendly
24	10 September 2003	Old Trafford, Manchester	Liechtenstein	1–0	2–0	UEFA Euro 2004 qualifying
25	1 June 2004	City of Manchester Stadium, Manchester	Japan	1–0	1–1	2004 FA Summer Tournament
26	24 June 2004	Estádio da Luz, Lisbon	Portugal	1–0	2–2 (5–6p)	UEFA Euro 2004
27	18 August 2004	St James' Park, Newcastle	Ukraine	2–0	3–0	Friendly
28	13 October 2004	Tofiq Bahramov Republican Stadium, Baku	Azerbaijan	1–0	1–0	2006 FIFA World Cup qualification
29	26 March 2005	Old Trafford, Manchester	Northern Ireland	2–0	4–0	2006 FIFA World Cup qualification
30	31 May 2005	Giants Stadium, East Rutherford	Colombia	1–0	3–2	Friendly
31	31 May 2005	Giants Stadium, East Rutherford	Colombia	2–0	3–2	Friendly
32	31 May 2005	Giants Stadium, East Rutherford	Colombia	3–1	3–2	Friendly
33	12 October 2005	Old Trafford, Manchester	Poland	1–0	2–1	2006 FIFA World Cup qualification
34	12 November 2005	Stade de Genève, Geneva	Argentina	2–2	3–2	Friendly
35	12 November 2005	Stade de Genève, Geneva	Argentina	3–2	3–2	Friendly
36	3 June 2006	Old Trafford, Manchester	Jamaica	4–0	6–0	Friendly
37	6 June 2007	A. Le Coq Arena, Tallinn	Estonia	3–0	3–0	UEFA Euro 2008 qualifying
38	8 September 2007	Wembley Stadium, London	Israel	2–0	3–0	UEFA Euro 2008 qualifying
39	12 September 2007	Wembley Stadium, London	Russia	1–0	3–0	UEFA Euro 2008 qualifying
40	12 September 2007	Wembley Stadium, London	Russia	2–0	3–0	UEFA Euro 2008 qualifying

== Honours ==
Liverpool

- FA Cup: 2000–01
- Football League Cup: 2000–01, 2002–03
- FA Charity Shield: 2001
- UEFA Cup: 2000–01
- UEFA Super Cup: 2001

Newcastle United

- UEFA Intertoto Cup: 2006

Manchester United

- Premier League: 2010–11
- Football League Cup: 2009–10
- FA Community Shield: 2010
- UEFA Champions League runner-up: 2010–11

Individual

- Ballon d'Or: 2001
- World Soccer World Player of the Year: 2001
- ESM Team of the Year: 2000–01
- Onze d'Argent: 2001
- BBC Sports Personality of the Year: 1998
- Premier League Golden Boot: 1997–98, 1998–99
- Premier League Player of the Season: 1997–98
- PFA Young Player of the Year: 1997–98
- PFA Team of the Year: 1997–98 Premier League
- Premier League Player of the Month: August 1998
- FIFA World Cup Best Young Player Award: France 1998
- FIFA World Cup All-Star Team: 1998 (Reserve)
- Premier League 10 Seasons Awards: Domestic Team of the Decade
- FIFA 100
- English Football Hall of Fame: 2014
- Golden Foot: 2017, as football legend
