= Jørgen Nielsen (footballer, born 1971) =

Danish footballer

Personal information
- Full name: Jørgen Tofte Nielsen
- Date of birth: 6 May 1971 (age 55)
- Place of birth: Nykøbing Falster, Denmark
- Height: 1.86 m (6 ft 1 in)
- Position: Goalkeeper

Youth career
- 1975–1986: Nakskov Boldklub

Senior career*
Years	Team	Apps	(Gls)
1986–1990	Nakskov Boldklub	30	(0)
1991–1993	Helsingør IF	46	(0)
1993–1994	Næstved	1	(0)
1994–1995	Ølstykke FC	60	(0)
1995–1996	Hvidovre IF	35	(0)
1997–2002	Liverpool	0	(0)
1998	→ Ikast FS (loan)	9	(0)
1999	→ Wolverhampton Wanderers (loan)	0	(0)
2002–2003	Farum BK	16	(0)
2003	Hellerup	1	(0)
2003–2007	Frem	127	(0)
2008	Frem	14	(0)
Total		340	(0)
- * Club domestic league appearances and goals

Jørgen Tofte Nielsen (born 6 May 1971) is a Danish former professional footballer who played as a goalkeeper.

== Playing career ==
Nielsen was born in Nykøbing Falster, Denmark. He signed for Liverpool in 1997 and was at Anfield for five years, but he left in 2002 having never playing a competitive game for the club. However, his shirt did taste Premier League action, against Everton on 27 September 1999. In the 77th minute of the game, goalkeeper Sander Westerveld and Everton striker Francis Jeffers got into a fight and both were sent off, but due to Liverpool having used all of their substitutions, left back Steve Staunton borrowed Nielsen's shirt and filled in as goalkeeper for the remainder of the match.

Nielsen retired from playing in September 2007 in order to concentrate on his political science university degree. In March 2008 he made his comeback.

== Honours ==
Individual

- Det Gyldne Bur (Goalkeeper of the Year in the Danish Leagues): 1996
