= Rob Harris (referee) =

English football referee

Robert J. Harris
- Full name: Robert J. Harris
- Born: c. 1957; Oxford, England
- Other occupation: Warranty Director, Ford UK; Referee assessor and coach (former)

Domestic
Years	League	Role
1988–1994	Football League	Linesman / Assistant referee
1994–1998	Football League (National Referees List)	Referee
1998–2001	Premier League	Referee

International
Years	League	Role
1992–1994	FIFA	Assistant referee

Robert J. Harris (born c. 1957) is an English former football referee who operated in the Football League and Premier League. He was for a time regarded as one of the best linesman on the Premier League, before his promotion to first the Football League and then the Premier League referees lists. But his Premier League referee period did not go well as he was the recipient of criticism for some very high-profile contentious incidents at Arsenal, West Ham and Tranmere which without doubt disrupted his time on the referees list. During his refereeing career he was mainly based in the city of Oxford.

== Career ==
He took up refereeing in 1975. He quickly progressed through the local Oxford Junior and Senior Leagues onto the Hellenic Football League. After that he got further promotions onto the Football Combination in 1982 and then the Southern League in 1985. He became a Football League linesman in 1988.

During the 1989–90 season Harris was involved in the match looked upon as saving Alex Ferguson's Old Trafford career, the FA cup third round tie between Nottingham Forest and Manchester United in which Harris acted as a linesman. The match was believed to be important as after some seven games without a win, should Manchester United lose this game Ferguson would be sacked soon after, this being his last chance to get a win. During the second half of the match Mark Robins scored for Manchester United, but with only three minutes of the match remaining Nottingham Forest felt they had equalized when following a goalmouth scramble the ball found its way into the Manchester United goal. The referee immediately gave the goal until Harris flagged for an infringement against Nottingham Forest and the goal was disallowed, Television replays after the match were unable to discover the reason for his decision and what he could have seen from his position on the line. With Manchester United winning the match 1-0 they went on to win the FA cup that season, giving Ferguson his first major trophy as their manager.

He made progress and in 1992 he became one of the first ever FIFA assistant referees. A few months later he assisted Philip Don in the FA Cup Final between Liverpool and Sunderland. He was one of the first assistants for the new Premier League when that started a few months later.

Two years later came further honours. In May he was appointed to assist Philip Don once more, this time in the 1994 European Cup Final between AC Milan and Barcelona. This was the first time that three English officials have controlled the Final, (In May 2010 Howard Webb and his team of English officials were appointed to the 2010 Champions League final at the Santiago Bernabéu Stadium in Madrid). Harris was also appointed to the National Referees List for the following season (1994–95).

Over the next four seasons he established himself in the Football League. He took charge of a greater number of games, including play-off matches, and in 1998 he was promoted to the Premier League referees List.

Harris has also refereed two Coppa Italia finals; first in 1999 between Parma and Fiorentina, and then the 2000 final between Internazionale and Roma.

== Criticisms ==
Harris served as a Premier referee for three seasons but three major incidents marred this period. In May 1999 he sent off three West Ham players as they lost heavily at home to Leeds United. David Elleray was fourth official. After the game Harris narrowly escaped being attacked by home supporters as he waited in his car at traffic lights.^{†} This led to a new policy by the Premier League where all officials are transported to games by people-carrier, to reduce the risk of such an event.

In January 2000 he sent off Clint Hill of Tranmere near the end of their home FA Cup tie with Sunderland. As Hill was leaving the field Tranmere made a substitution but in the confusion no player was actually withdrawn. None of the officials noticed this, and the home team continued to play with eleven men rather than ten in the final minutes. This error of Law is treated very seriously, and as a result Harris was suspended and did not officiate again for another two months.^{‡}

Harris also showed Aston Villa player Lee Hendrie two yellow cards in a match against Arsenal at Highbury Stadium in October 2000. He only showed the red card after numerous players from both teams pointed to the large video screens alongside the pitch, which showed the team line-ups plus information on goalscorer, bookings and substitutions.

He did carry on at Premier level for the next season, and although he was offered a contract from the PGMOL to become a full time Referee for season 2001-02, he decided to Referee on the Football League for the following campaign and to continue his career in the automotive industry because of the retirement age that was in force for Referees on the National List at that time. In August 2000 he had moved from Oxford to the Isle of Wight, making him the first National List referee from this location.^{¶} (James Linington a current Football League referee is from the Isle of Wight) He only remained on the Football League for this one season (2001-02), before he resigned to become an Assessor for the 2002–03 and 2003-04 seasons. However for season 2004-05 he was appointed as a Referee Coach with the PGMOL Coaching Referees and Assistant Referees on the Football League and Referees on the National Conference, during this period he was also a Referee Assessor at Premier League matches. In July 2010 he lost his coaching position following Keith Hackett's retirement from his position as Chief Refereeing Officer of the PGMOL, when his successor conducted a reorganisation of the referee coaching team.

== Personal life ==
He is married to Ann with whom he has a daughter and two sons. He also enjoys his life with his two grandchildren Georgie and Charlotte. He works for Ford UK, as the warranty director for the UK.
