= Patrick Berger =

French architect (born 1947)

- Born: Patrick Berger; 10 November 1947; Paris, France
- Education: Beaux-Arts de Paris
- Occupation: Architect
- Awards: Grand prix national de l'architecture
- Buildings: UEFA Headquarters
- Projects: Forum des Halles; Parc André-Citroën; Viaduc des Arts

Patrick Berger (born 10 November 1947 in Paris) is a French architect. He was the 2004 recipient of the Grand prix national de l'architecture.

== Biography ==
Berger trained as an architect at the Beaux-Arts de Paris, graduating in 1972, before opening his practice in 1974.

== Portfolio ==
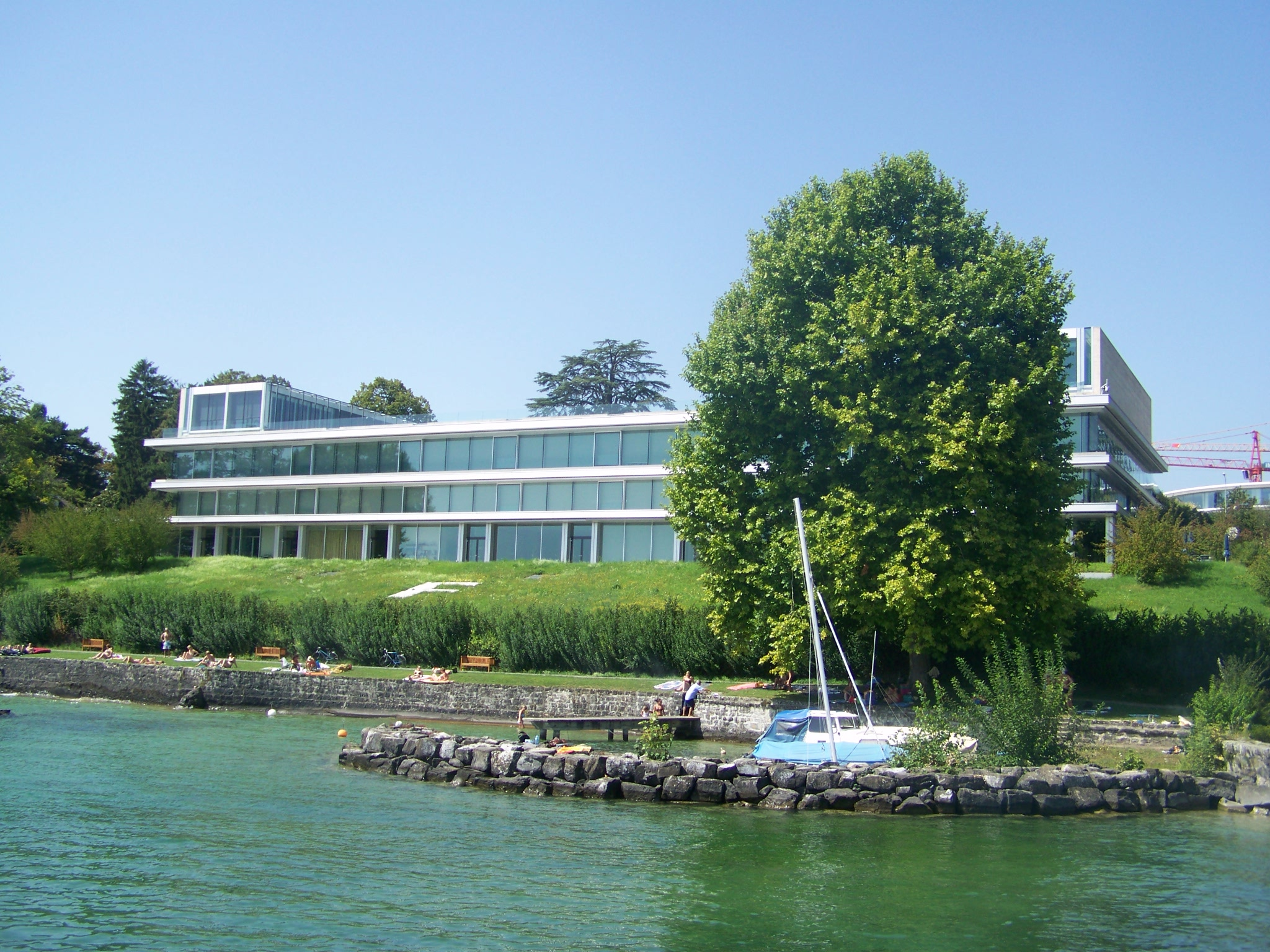
UEFA headquarters in Nyon, Switzerland

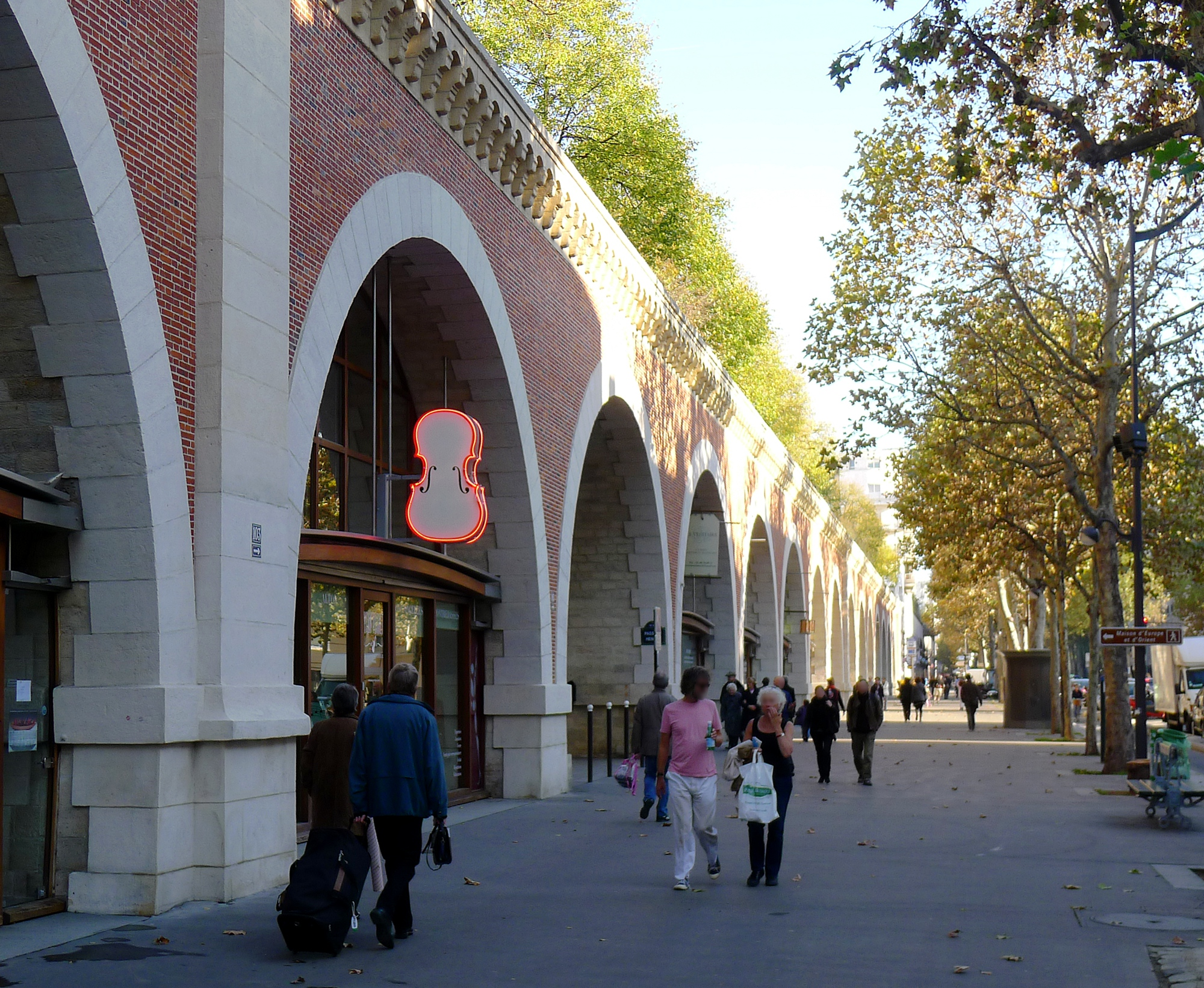
The Viaduc des Arts, converted from a disused railway viaduct in Paris

La Canopée at the Forum des Halles in Paris, as seen from the nearby Saint-Eustache church

- 1992: Parc André-Citroën, Paris
- 1996: Viaduc des Arts, Paris
- 1999: UEFA headquarters, Nyon, Switzerland
- 2016: La Canopée at the Forum des Halles, Paris
- 2018: reconstruction of Châtelet–Les Halles station, Paris
