= Bjørn Tore Kvarme =

Norwegian footballer (born 1972)

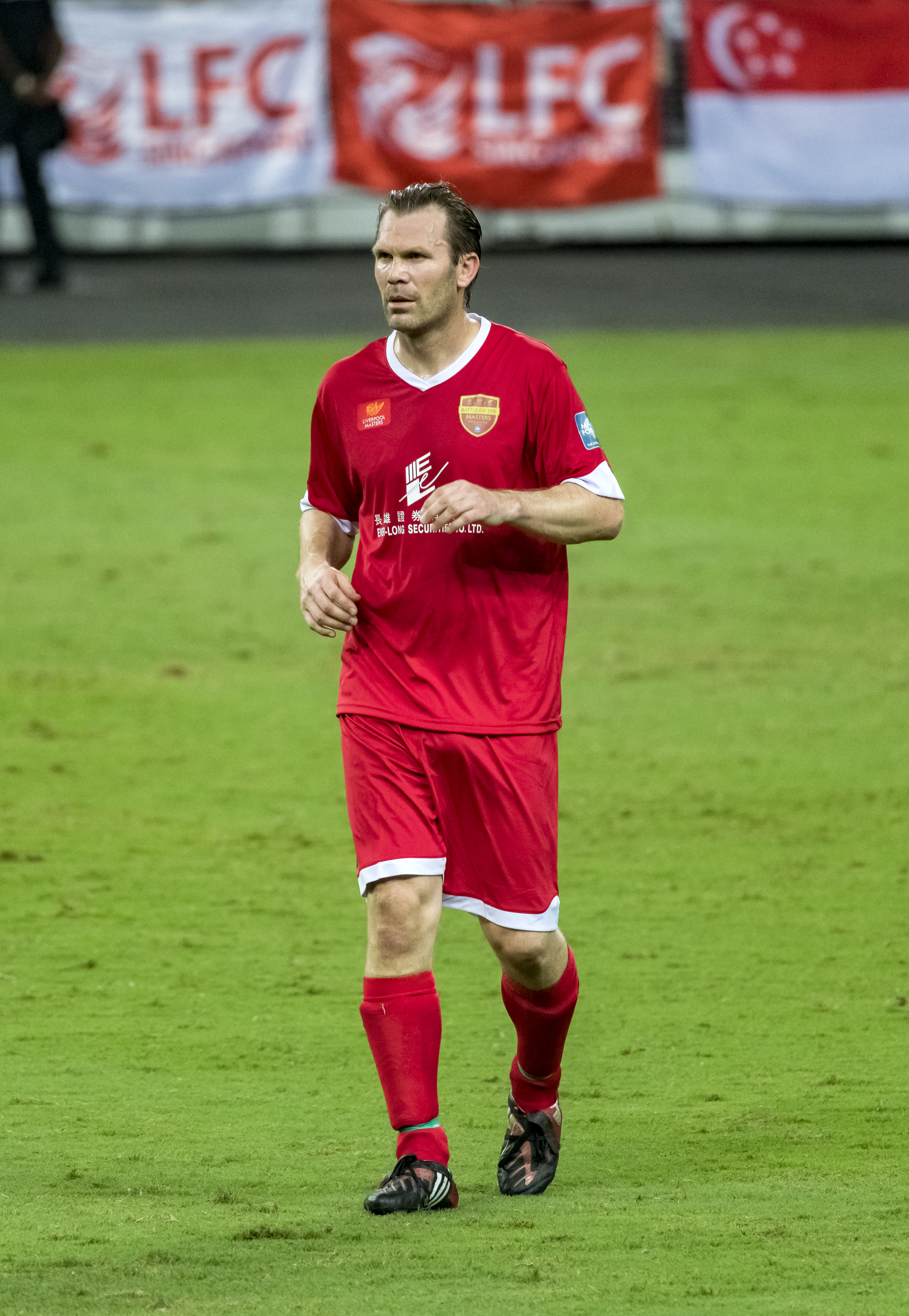
- Kvarme in 2017

Personal information
- Date of birth: 17 June 1972 (age 54)
- Place of birth: Trondheim, Norway
- Height: 1.85 m (6 ft 1 in)
- Position: Defender

Youth career
- 1991: Utleira

Senior career*
Years	Team	Apps	(Gls)
1991–1997	Rosenborg	88	(2)
1997–1999	Liverpool	45	(0)
1999–2001	Saint-Étienne	53	(0)
2001–2004	Real Sociedad	84	(0)
2004–2005	Bastia	11	(0)
2005–2008	Rosenborg	47	(0)
Total		328	(2)

International career
	Norway U21	11	(0)
1997	Norway	1	(0)
- * Club domestic league appearances and goals

Bjørn Tore Kvarme (born 17 June 1972) is a Norwegian former professional footballer who played as a defender. Kvarme earned one cap for the Norwegian national team, a friendly against Colombia in 1997.

== Career ==
Kvarme was born in Trondheim, Norway. He first signed with Rosenborg in 1991, transferring from Utleira, a local club. He played six seasons, winning the Tippeliga five times. In the autumn of 1996 Kvarme was on his way to sign for Stabæk, but Premier League club Liverpool outbid the Norwegian club. Kvarme spent three years on Merseyside. In 1999, he was transferred to the French club Saint-Étienne, where he played two seasons and became their club captain, before signing for Real Sociedad in La Liga. He spent three seasons in the Basque Country, before moving back to France, this time playing for Bastia for half a season. In 2005, he returned to his hometown club.

Bjørn Tore Kvarme announced that he would retire after the 2007 season. Citing injuries and lack of playing time as the main reasons for retiring, he did, however, agree to play for another year with Rosenborg. Kvarme retired in June 2008, mid-season.
