= 1996–97 Liverpool F.C. season =

English football club season

Liverpool
1996–97 season
- Chairman: David Moores
- Manager: Roy Evans
- Premier League: 4th
- FA Cup: Fourth round
- League Cup: Fifth round
- Cup Winners' Cup: Semi-finals
- Top goalscorer: League: Robbie Fowler (18); All: Robbie Fowler (31)
- Average home league attendance: 38,436
Home colours	Away colours

The 1996–97 Liverpool F.C. season was the 105th season in the club's existence, and their 35th consecutive year in the top-flight of English football. In addition to the FA Premier League (known as the FA Carling Premiership for sponsorship reasons), the club competed in the FA Cup, League Cup, and the Cup Winners' Cup.

== Season overview ==
Liverpool led the Premiership for much of the season, and established a five-point lead at the top before New Year's Day 1997. However, the team were overtaken by Manchester United in the latter stages of the season, and it was United who ultimately won the league, though Liverpool squandered several more chances to reclaim the top position. The side were marred both by the rise of the "Spice Boys" culture, as well as by defensive aberrations; dropping points at their previously impregnable Anfield home. A 2–1 home defeat against bottom of the table Coventry City denied Liverpool the chance to return to top spot with six games to go, United having lost at home to Derby the previous day. Indeed, a win over United at Anfield in April would have put Liverpool top with just three matches to go, but United won 3–1 to effectively clinch the title. The title lost, Liverpool still went into the final match of the season in second place with a two-point lead over Newcastle and Arsenal, but a 1–1 draw with Sheffield Wednesday meant they ended up finishing 4th on goal difference, thus missing out on a place in the newly expanded UEFA Champions League and leaving Roy Evans and his team with a UEFA Cup place as scant consolation for a season which had promised much and giving rise to the phrase "finishing fourth in a two horse race".

In the cups there was more disappointment. Liverpool's UEFA Cup Winners' Cup campaign ended in the semi-finals with a 3–2 aggregate defeat to Paris St Germain. In the FA Cup they lost 4–2 to eventual winners Chelsea in the fourth round, having led 2–0 at half-time and squandered chances to extend their lead. Liverpool were knocked out in the Coca-Cola Cup quarter-finals by eventual finalists Middlesbrough.

The side were nevertheless praised for their attractive attacking style of football. Steve McManaman and Robbie Fowler continued to excel for the club, and Fowler continued his prolific strike partnership with Stan Collymore, scoring 47 goals between them. Fowler's suspension for the final four games was a big blow and effectively ended any lingering hopes of title glory. Fowler also received a UEFA Fair Play award, for protesting that he had not been fouled by Arsenal goalkeeper David Seaman when the referee awarded a penalty kick. The season also saw the debut of teenage prodigy Michael Owen.

Former defender Mark Wright stated in an interview that this was the season in the 1990s that the Liverpool team truly had the talent and opportunity to win the title but threw it away: "We did come close to winning the league a few times and we finished fourth one season when we were the best team. We were better than Manchester United, better than everyone, and we finished joint second but ended up fourth because of goal difference. That was the season we should have won the title and we all know that. I remember some of the games we lost and the way we dropped points against certain sides. David James dropped a few clangers and I remember them because in certain games he didn't have anything to do, then all of a sudden he thinks he's got to be involved in the game. He would come rushing out and all of a sudden you would be 1–0 down", he said.

== First-team squad ==
Note: Flags indicate national team as defined under FIFA eligibility rules; some limited exceptions apply. Players may hold more than one non-FIFA nationality.

No.	Pos.	Nation	Player
1	GK	(England) ENG	David James
2	DF	(England) ENG	Rob Jones
3	DF	(England) ENG	John Scales
3	DF	(Norway) NOR	Bjørn Tore Kvarme
4	DF	(Republic of Ireland) IRL	Jason McAteer (Note: McAteer was born in Tranmere, England, but also qualified to represent the Republic of Ireland internationally and made his international debut for the Republic of Ireland in March 1994.)
5	DF	(England) ENG	Mark Wright
6	DF	(Republic of Ireland) IRL	Phil Babb (Note: Babb was born in Lambeth, England, but also qualified to represent the Republic of Ireland internationally and made his international debut for the Republic of Ireland in 1994.)
7	MF	(England) ENG	Steve McManaman
8	FW	(England) ENG	Stan Collymore
9	FW	(England) ENG	Robbie Fowler
10	MF	(England) ENG	John Barnes (Note: Barnes was born in Kingston, Jamaica, but also qualified to represent any of the home nations internationally as he held a British passport and made his international debut for England in May 1983.)
11	MF	(England) ENG	Jamie Redknapp
12	DF	(England) ENG	Steve Harkness

No.	Pos.	Nation	Player
13	GK	(England) ENG	Tony Warner (Note: Warner was born in Liverpool, England, but also qualified to represent Trinidad and Tobago internationally and would make his international debut for Trinidad and Tobago in February 2006.)
14	DF	(England) ENG	Neil Ruddock
15	MF	(Czech Republic) CZE	Patrik Berger
16	MF	(England) ENG	Michael Thomas
18	FW	(England) ENG	Michael Owen
19	MF	(Republic of Ireland) IRL	Mark Kennedy
20	DF	(Norway) NOR	Stig Inge Bjørnebye
21	DF	(England) ENG	Dominic Matteo (Note: Matteo was born in Dumfries, Scotland, but was raised in England from the age of four and represented them at U-21 and B level before making his international debut for Scotland in November 2000.)
22	MF	(England) ENG	Jamie Cassidy
23	DF	(England) ENG	Jamie Carragher
24	FW	(Wales) WAL	Lee Jones
25	MF	(England) ENG	David Thompson
26	GK	(Denmark) DEN	Jørgen Nielsen

== Transfers ==
=== In ===
#	Pos	Player	From	Fee	Date
15	MF	(Czech Republic) Patrik Berger	(Germany) Borussia Dortmund	£3,250,000	15 August 1996
28	MF	(Australia) Nick Rizzo	(Australia) Sydney Olympic	Free	1 September 1996
3	DF	(Norway) Bjørn Tore Kvarme	(Norway) Rosenborg	Free	10 January 1997

=== Out ===
#	Pos	Player	To	Fee	Date
27	GK	(England) Stephen Pears	(England) Hartlepool United	Free	1 June 1996
18	MF	(England) Phil Charnock	(England) Crewe Alexandra	Free	6 December 1996
3	DF	(England) John Scales	(England) Tottenham Hotspur	£2,600,000	11 December 1996

== Competitions ==
=== Premier League ===
==== League table ====
Pos	Team	Pld	W	D	L	GF	GA	GD	Pts	Qualification or relegation
2	Newcastle United	38	19	11	8	73	40	+33	68	Qualification for the Champions League second qualifying round
3	Arsenal	38	19	11	8	62	32	+30	68	Qualification for the UEFA Cup first round (Note: Aston Villa was rewarded entry to the UEFA Cup through UEFA Fair Play ranking.)
4	Liverpool	38	19	11	8	62	37	+25	68	Qualification for the UEFA Cup first round
5	Aston Villa	38	17	10	11	47	34	+13	61	Qualification for the UEFA Cup first round
6	Chelsea	38	16	11	11	58	55	+3	59	Qualification for the Cup Winners' Cup first round (Note: Chelsea qualified for the Cup Winners' Cup as FA Cup winners.)

Source: Premier League
Rules for classification: 1) points; 2) goal difference; 3) number of goals scored.

==== Results by round ====
Round	1	2	3	4	5	6	7	8	9	10	11	12	13	14	15	16	17	18	19	20	21	22	23	24	25	26	27	28	29	30	31	32	33	34	35	36	37	38
Ground	A	H	H	A	H	A	H	A	A	H	A	A	H	H	A	H	H	H	A	H	A	A	H	H	A	H	H	A	H	A	A	H	A	A	H	H	A	A
Result	D	W	D	W	W	W	W	W	L	W	L	W	D	D	W	L	W	W	D	D	W	L	D	W	W	W	D	L	W	D	W	L	W	D	L	W	L	D
Position	9	4	7	4	3	1	1	1	3	3	2	3	2	3	2	3	2	2	2	2	1	2	3	3	2	2	3	4	4	4	4	4	3	4	4	3	2	4

Source: Competitive Matches
A = Away; H = Home; W = Win; D = Draw; L = Loss

==== Matches ====
17 August 1996 1	Middlesbrough	3–3	Liverpool	Middlesbrough, North Yorkshire
15:00	Ravanelli 26' (pen.), 36', 81'	Report	Bjørnebye 4'; Barnes 29'; Fowler 65'	Stadium: Riverside Stadium; Attendance: 30,039

19 August 1996 2	Liverpool	2–0	Arsenal	Liverpool, Merseyside
20:00 BST	McManaman 68', 74'			Stadium: Anfield; Attendance: 38,103; Referee: Gary Willard

24 August 1996 3	Liverpool	0–0	Sunderland	Liverpool, Merseyside
15:00				Stadium: Anfield; Attendance: 40,503

4 September 1996 4	Coventry City	0–1	Liverpool	Coventry, West Midlands
19:45			Babb 68'	Stadium: Highfield Road; Attendance: 23,021

7 September 1996 5	Liverpool	2–1	Southampton	Liverpool, Merseyside
15:00	Collymore 39'; McManaman 89'		Magilton 68'	Stadium: Anfield; Attendance: 39,189

15 September 1996 6	Leicester City	0–3	Liverpool	Leicester, Leicestershire
15:00			Berger 58', 77'; Thomas 61'	Stadium: Filbert Street; Attendance: 20,987

21 September 1996 7	Liverpool	5–1	Chelsea	Liverpool, Merseyside
15:00	Fowler 15'; Berger 42', 49'; Myers 45' (o.g.); Barnes 57'		Leboeuf 85'	Stadium: Anfield; Attendance: 40,739

29 September 1996 8	West Ham United	1–2	Liverpool	Newham, London
15:00	Bilić 15'		Collymore 3'; Thomas 55'	Attendance: 25,064

12 October 1996 9	Manchester United	1–0	Liverpool	Trafford, Greater Manchester
11:15	Beckham 23'			Stadium: Old Trafford; Attendance: 55,128

27 October 1996 10	Liverpool	2–1	Derby County	Liverpool, Merseyside
16:00	Fowler 47', 51'		A. Ward 89'	Stadium: Anfield; Attendance: 39,515

3 November 1996 11	Blackburn Rovers	3–0	Liverpool	Blackburn, Lancashire
15:00	Sutton 3' (pen.), 56'; Wilcox 24'			Stadium: Ewood Park; Attendance: 29,598

16 November 1996 12	Leeds United	0–2	Liverpool	Leeds, West Yorkshire
15:00			Ruddock 13'; McManaman 90'	Stadium: Elland Road; Attendance: 39,981

20 November 1996 13	Liverpool	1–1	Everton	Liverpool, Merseyside
19:45	Fowler 30'		Speed 82'	Stadium: Anfield; Attendance: 40,751

23 November 1996 14	Liverpool	1–1	Wimbledon	Liverpool, Merseyside
15:00	Collymore 1'		Leonhardsen 67'	Stadium: Anfield; Attendance: 39,027

2 December 1996 15	Tottenham Hotspur	0–2	Liverpool	Haringey, London
20:00			Thomas 45'; McManaman 49'	Stadium: White Hart Lane

7 December 1996 16	Liverpool	0–1	Sheffield Wednesday	Liverpool, Merseyside
15:00			Whittingham 21'	Stadium: Anfield; Attendance: 39,507

14 December 1996 17	Liverpool	5–1	Middlesbrough	Liverpool, Merseyside
15:00	Fowler 1', 28', 77', 85'; Bjørnebye 45'		Fjørtoft 75'	Stadium: Anfield; Attendance: 39,491

17 December 1996 18	Liverpool	4–2	Nottingham Forest	Liverpool, Merseyside
19:45	Collymore 6', 63'; Fowler 27'; Lyttle 53' (o.g.)		Campbell 34'; Pearce 60'	Stadium: Anfield; Attendance: 36,126

23 December 1996 19	Newcastle United	1–1	Liverpool	Newcastle-upon-Tyne, Tyne and Wear
20:00	Shearer 28'		Fowler 45'	Stadium: St. James' Park; Attendance: 36,570

26 December 1996 20	Liverpool	1–1	Leicester City	Liverpool, Merseyside
15:00	Collymore 80'		Claridge 76'	Stadium: Anfield; Attendance: 40,786

29 December 1996 21	Southampton	0–1	Liverpool	Southampton, Hampshire
16:00			Barnes 76'	Stadium: The Dell; Attendance: 15,222

1 January 1997 22	Chelsea	1–0	Liverpool	Fulham, London
15:00	Di Matteo 43'			Stadium: Stamford Bridge; Attendance: 28,329

11 January 1997 23	Liverpool	0–0	West Ham United	Liverpool, Merseyside
15:00				Stadium: Anfield; Attendance: 40,102

18 January 1997 24	Liverpool	3–0	Aston Villa	Liverpool, Merseyside
15:00	Carragher 50'; Collymore 58'; Fowler 63'			Stadium: Anfield; Attendance: 40,489

1 February 1997 25	Derby County	0–1	Liverpool	Derby, Derbyshire
15:00			Collymore 75'	Stadium: Baseball Ground; Attendance: 18,102

19 February 1997 26	Liverpool	4–0	Leeds United	Liverpool, Merseyside
19:45	Fowler 21'; Collymore 36', 37'; Redknapp 87'			Stadium: Anfield; Attendance: 38,957

22 February 1997 27	Liverpool	0–0	Blackburn Rovers	Liverpool, Merseyside
15:00				Stadium: Anfield; Attendance: 40,747

2 March 1997 28	Aston Villa	1–0	Liverpool	Birmingham, West Midlands
16:00	Taylor 83'			Stadium: Villa Park; Attendance: 39,339

10 March 1997 29	Liverpool	4–3	Newcastle United	Liverpool, Merseyside
20:00	McManaman 29'; Berger 30'; Fowler 42', 90'		Gillespie 71'; Asprilla 87'; Barton 88'	Stadium: Anfield; Attendance: 40,751

15 March 1997 30	Nottingham Forest	1–1	Liverpool	Nottingham
15:00	Woan 30'		Fowler 4'	Stadium: City Ground; Attendance: 29,181

24 March 1997 31	Arsenal	1–2	Liverpool	Islington, London
20:00 GMT	Wright 78'		Collymore 50'; McAteer 65'	Stadium: Highbury; Attendance: 38,068; Referee: Gerald Ashby

6 April 1997 32	Liverpool	1–2	Coventry City	Liverpool, Merseyside
15:00	Fowler 52'		Whelan 65'; Dublin 90'	Stadium: Anfield; Attendance: 40,079

13 April 1997 33	Sunderland	1–2	Liverpool	Sunderland, Tyne and Wear
15:00	Stewart 53'		Fowler 33'; McManaman 47'	Stadium: Roker Park; Attendance: 21,938

16 April 1997 34	Everton	1–1	Liverpool	Liverpool, Merseyside
19:45	Ferguson 65'		Redknapp 26'	Stadium: Goodison Park; Attendance: 40,177

19 April 1997 35	Liverpool	1–3	Manchester United	Liverpool, Merseyside
11:15	Barnes 19'		Pallister 13', 42'; Cole 63'	Stadium: Anfield; Attendance: 40,892

3 May 1997 36	Liverpool	2–1	Tottenham Hotspur	Liverpool, Merseyside
15:00	Collymore 15'; Berger 43'		Anderton 5'	Stadium: Anfield

6 May 1997 37	Wimbledon	2–1	Liverpool	Croydon, London
19:45	Euell 43'; Holdsworth 55'		Owen 74'	Stadium: Selhurst Park; Attendance: 20,016

11 May 1997 38	Sheffield Wednesday	1–1	Liverpool	Sheffield
16:00	Donaldson 75'		Redknapp 83'	Stadium: Hillsborough; Attendance: 38,943

=== FA Cup ===
4 January 1997 Third round	Liverpool	1–0	Burnley	Liverpool
	Collymore 12'	(Report)		Stadium: Anfield; Attendance: 33,252

26 January 1997 Fourth round	Chelsea	4–2	Liverpool	London
	Hughes 50'; Zola 58'; Vialli 63', 76'	(Report)	Fowler 10'; Collymore 21'	Stadium: Stamford Bridge; Attendance: 27,950

=== Football League Cup ===
23 October 1996 Third round	Charlton Athletic	1–1	Liverpool	London
	Whyte 18'	Report	Fowler 21'	Stadium: The Valley; Attendance: 15,000

13 November 1996 Third round replay	Liverpool	4–1	Charlton Athletic	Liverpool
	Wright 14'; Redknapp 18'; Fowler 48', 73'	Report	Newton 21'	Stadium: Anfield; Attendance: 20,714

27 November 1996 Fourth round	Liverpool	4–2	Arsenal	Liverpool
	McManaman 26'; Fowler 39' (pen.), 52'; Berger 72'	Report	Wright 13' (pen.), 68' (pen.)	Stadium: Anfield; Attendance: 32,814

8 January 1997 Quarter-final	Middlesbrough	2–1	Liverpool	Middlesbrough
	Hignett 14'; Vickers 21'	Report	McManaman 65'	Stadium: Riverside Stadium; Attendance: 28,670

=== Cup Winners' Cup ===
12 September 1996 First round, first leg	MyPa (Finland)	0–1	(England) Liverpool	Anjalankoski
		Report	Bjørnebye 61'	Stadium: Kymenlaakson Sähkö Stadion; Attendance: 4,767

26 September 1996 First round, second leg	Liverpool (England)	3–1 (4–1 agg.)	(Finland) MyPa	Liverpool
	Berger 16'; Collymore 59'; Barnes 77'	Report	Keskitalo 64'	Stadium: Anfield; Attendance: 39,013

17 October 1996 Second round, first leg	Sion (Switzerland)	1–2	(England) Liverpool	Sion
	Bonvin 10'	Report	Fowler 28'; Barnes 80'	Stadium: Stade Tourbillon; Attendance: 15,500

31 October 1996 Second round, second leg	Liverpool (England)	6–3 (8–4 agg.)	(Switzerland) Sion	Liverpool
	McManaman 27'; Bjørnebye 55'; Barnes 66'; Fowler 70', 79'; Berger 89'	Report	Chassot 20', 65'; Bonvin 23'	Stadium: Anfield; Attendance: 38,514

6 March 1997 Quarter-final, first leg	Brann (Norway)	1–1	(England) Liverpool	Bergen
	Hasund 48'	Report	Fowler 10'	Stadium: Brann Stadion; Attendance: 12,700

20 March 1997 Quarter-final, second leg	Liverpool (England)	3–0 (4–1 agg.)	(Norway) Brann	Liverpool
	Fowler 25' (pen.), 77'; Collymore 61'	Report		Stadium: Anfield; Attendance: 40,326

10 April 1997 Semi-final, first leg	Paris Saint-Germain (France)	3–0	(England) Liverpool	Paris
	Leonardo 11'; Cauet 43'; Leroy 83'	Report		Stadium: Parc des Princes; Attendance: 35,142

24 April 1997 Semi-final, second leg	Liverpool (England)	2–0 (2–3 agg.)	(France) Paris Saint-Germain	Liverpool
	Fowler 12'; Wright 79'	Report		Stadium: Anfield; Attendance: 39,000

== Statistics ==
=== Appearances and goals ===
No.	Pos	Nat	Player	Total		Premier League		FA Cup		League Cup		CWC	
No.	Pos	Nat	Player	Apps	Goals	Apps	Goals	Apps	Goals	Apps	Goals	Apps	Goals
Goalkeepers
1	GK	(England) ENG	David James	52	0	38	0	2	0	4	0	8	0
Defenders
2	DF	(England) ENG	Rob Jones	3	0	2	0	0	0	1	0	0	0
3	DF	(Norway) NOR	Bjørn Tore Kvarme	17	0	15	0	1	0	1	0	0	0
5	DF	(England) ENG	Mark Wright	43	2	33	0	2	0	3	1	5	1
6	DF	(Republic of Ireland) IRL	Phil Babb	31	1	21+1	1	1	0	3	0	4+1	0
12	DF	(England) ENG	Steve Harkness	10	0	5+2	0	0	0	0	0	3	0
14	DF	(England) ENG	Neil Ruddock	22	1	15+2	1	0	0	2	0	2+1	0
19	DF	(Republic of Ireland) IRL	Mark Kennedy	8	0	0+5	0	0+1	0	0+1	0	0+1	0
20	DF	(Norway) NOR	Stig Inge Bjørnebye	52	4	38	2	2	0	4	0	8	2
21	DF	(England) ENG	Dominic Matteo	38	0	22+4	0	2	0	3	0	7	0
Midfielders
4	MF	(Republic of Ireland) IRL	Jason McAteer	51	1	36+1	1	2	0	4	0	8	0
7	MF	(England) ENG	Steve McManaman	51	10	37	7	2	0	4	2	8	1
10	MF	(England) ENG	John Barnes	47	7	34+1	4	2	0	3	0	7	3
11	MF	(England) ENG	Jamie Redknapp	32	4	18+5	3	1	0	1	1	4+3	0
15	MF	(Czech Republic) CZE	Patrik Berger	34	9	13+10	6	1+1	0	3	1	6	2
16	MF	(England) ENG	Michael Thomas	42	3	29+2	3	1	0	4	0	5+1	0
23	MF	(England) ENG	Jamie Carragher	3	1	1+1	1	0	0	0+1	0	0	0
25	MF	(England) ENG	David Thompson	2	0	0+2	0	0	0	0	0	0	0
Forwards
8	FW	(England) ENG	Stan Collymore	37	16	25+5	12	2	2	0	0	4+1	2
9	FW	(England) ENG	Robbie Fowler	44	31	32	18	1	1	4	5	7	7
18	FW	(England) ENG	Michael Owen	2	1	1+1	1	0	0	0	0	0	0
24	FW	(Wales) WAL	Lee Jones	2	0	0+2	0	0	0	0	0	0	0
Players transferred out during the season
3	DF	(England) ENG	John Scales	7	0	3	0	0	0	1	0	2+1	0

=== Goal scorers ===
Rank	No.	Pos	Nat	Name	Premier League	FA Cup	League Cup	Cup Winners' Cup	Total
1	9	FW	(England)	Robbie Fowler	18	1	5	7	31
2	8	FW	(England)	Stan Collymore	12	2	0	2	16
3	7	MF	(England)	Steve McManaman	7	0	2	1	10
4	15	MF	(Czech Republic)	Patrick Berger	6	0	1	2	9
5	10	MF	(England)	John Barnes	4	0	0	3	7
6	11	MF	(England)	Jamie Redknapp	3	0	1	0	4
6	20	DF	(Norway)	Stig Inge Bjørnebye	2	0	0	2	4
8	16	MF	(England)	Michael Thomas	3	0	0	0	3
9	5	DF	(England)	Mark Wright	0	0	1	1	2
10	4	DF	(Republic of Ireland)	Jason McAteer	1	0	0	0	1
10	6	DF	(Republic of Ireland)	Phil Babb	1	0	0	0	1
10	14	DF	(England)	Neil Ruddock	1	0	0	0	1
10	18	FW	(England)	Michael Owen	1	0	0	0	1
10	23	DF	(England)	Jamie Carragher	1	0	0	0	1
Own goal					2	0	0	0	2
Totals					62	3	10	18	93

=== Competition top scorers ===
Competition	Result	Top scorer
Premier League	4th	(England) Robbie Fowler, 18
UEFA CWC	Semi-finals	(England) Robbie Fowler, 7
FA Cup	Fourth round	(England) Stan Collymore, 2
League Cup	Fifth round	(England) Robbie Fowler, 5
Overall		(England) Robbie Fowler, 31
