= 1995–96 Liverpool F.C. season =

English football club season

Liverpool F.C.
1995–96 season
- Chairman: David Moores
- Manager: Roy Evans
- Premier League: 3rd
- FA Cup: Runners-up
- League Cup: Fourth round
- UEFA Cup: Second round
- Top goalscorer: League: Robbie Fowler (28); All: Robbie Fowler (36)
- Average home league attendance: 39,010
Home colours	Away colours	Third colours

The 1995–96 Liverpool F.C. season was the 104th season in the club's existence, and their 34th consecutive year in the top-flight. In addition to the FA Premier League (known as the FA Carling Premiership for sponsorship reasons), the club competed in the FA Cup, the League Cup, and the UEFA Cup.

== Season overview ==
During the 1995–96 close season, Liverpool signed Nottingham Forest striker Stan Collymore for a national record transfer fee of £8.5 million. As a result, the club was widely considered among the favourites to win the league title. Defending champions Blackburn Rovers made few significant additions to their squad, while runners-up Manchester United sold three key players and began the season without making a major signing.

Liverpool entered the season after finishing fourth in the 1994–95 campaign and winning the Football League Cup. Their squad included emerging talents such as striker Robbie Fowler and midfielders Steve McManaman and Jamie Redknapp. By the end of the 1995–96 season, Fowler finished as the league's second-highest goalscorer behind Alan Shearer, while McManaman recorded 25 assists across all competitions, including 15 in the Premier League.

Collymore too was rich on form from the beginning: he found the net on his debut at Liverpool won 1–0 at Sheffield Wednesday on the opening day of the Premier League season. A 1–0 defeat at Leeds United came two days later, followed by wins over Tottenham Hotspur and Queens Park Rangers.

September started on a low note for the Reds as they lost 1–0 at Wimbledon, but pulled together to win their following games 3–0 over Blackburn Rovers and 5–2 over newly promoted Bolton Wanderers (with Robbie Fowler scoring four times) to end September in third place, with a young Manchester United side and a bolstered Newcastle United leading the way. The month also the arrival of midfielder Jason McAteer from newly promoted Bolton Wanderers for £4.5million. McAteer was soon utilized as a right-back, with Rob Jones switching to left-back.

There was also success on the European scene, as the Reds overcame Spartak Vladikavkaz in the first round of the UEFA Cup, although their adventure ended in the second round with a shock exit at the hands of Danish side Brøndby. They did manage to edge past Sunderland in the League Cup second round and then crush Manchester City 4–0 in the third round. Three days after knocking them out of the League Cup, they faced City again at Anfield in the league. They beat Alan Ball's side 6–0, with Ian Rush and Robbie Fowler both scoring twice. The result left their opponents rooted to the bottom of the table and still looking for a league win after 11 games, but it was a big boost for the Reds, who were now four points behind leaders Newcastle United and three points adrift of second placed Manchester United. They were, however, closely under pressure from a resurgent Arsenal, newly promoted Middlesbrough and also a Nottingham Forest side who seemed to be coping well without Stan Collymore.

November was a disaster for the Reds, who failed to win any of their five games that month, losing 2–1 to Newcastle United, Everton and Middlesbrough in the league, in which they also drew 0–0 at West Ham United, and lost 1–0 to Newcastle United in the League Cup fourth round. They ended the month in seventh place, 14 points behind leaders Newcastle United. The title dream was now looking dead and buried with less than half of the season gone.

December was a much better month for the Reds, who were held 1–1 at Anfield by Southampton at the start of the month before winning 1–0 at struggling Bolton Wanderers. On 17 December, Robbie Fowler took his tally of goals against Manchester United for the season to four as he scored both goals in a 2–0 win at Anfield just over two months after netting twice in the 2–2 draw at Old Trafford. The Anfield win helped keep Newcastle United's lead of the Premier League a comfortable one. For the second season running, Robbie Fowler scored a league hat-trick at home to Arsenal, though this time in the space of nearly 40 minutes rather than the record breaking time of less than five minutes as had happened the previous season, as the Reds won 3–1. They were now just one point behind second placed Manchester United, though they were still 11 points adrift of leaders Newcastle United.

January was another successful month at Anfield as the Reds ended it in second place, ahead of Manchester United on goal difference, although Newcastle United still had a nine-point lead at the top. It seemed possible that Liverpool might be able to live up to their pre-season tag as title favourites after all.

Liverpool's best chance of silverware appeared to be in the FA Cup, where they began with a 7–0 third round win over Rochdale in which Ian Rush set a new record for career goals scored in the competition. They had a similarly easy opposition in the fourth round, winning 4–0 at home to Shrewsbury Town, and booked their place in the quarter-finals for the first time since 1992 by beating Charlton Athletic 2–1 in the fifth round at the end of February. They were still going well in the league, keeping up the pressure on the leading pack of Newcastle United and Manchester United, though by 24 February they were still nine points behind Kevin Keegan's leaders and Alex Ferguson's second place title chasers. The quarter-final brought a 3–0 win in the replay against Leeds United after a goalless draw in the first match, and the month ended with a 3–0 semi-final win over Aston Villa which booked them an FA Cup final clash with Manchester United.

April began with a 4–3 home win over Newcastle United – a match widely regarded as one of the most exciting league games of the 1990s. The result did a favour for Liverpool's fierce rivals Manchester United, as it kept their three-point lead over the Tynesiders intact, also keeping Liverpool's title hopes – and their hopes of a unique second double – alive, as they were now just five points off the top. However, a 1–0 defeat at struggling Coventry City three days later left Liverpool's title hopes looking practically dead. By the time of their 1–0 home win over Middlesbrough on 27 April, the title was beyond Liverpool's reach. They finished the season third in the Premier League – their highest league finish since finishing runners-up of the old Football League First Division in 1991 – and their last game was at Maine Road on 5 May, when they held Manchester City to a 2–2 draw, a result which saw their hosts relegated on goal difference. The game was also memorable for being the game where Ian Rush scored his final goal for the Reds; after more than 300 goals in two spells at the club over the last 16 years, he would be leaving on a free transfer at the end of the season.

The FA Cup final was played at Wembley Stadium on 11 May 1996. It was a relatively dull game despite all the hype that surrounded a clash under the twin towers for the nation's two most successful clubs, and with just five minutes remaining it was still deadlock and extra time was looking likely. However, in the 85th minute, David James punched clear a David Beckham corner, only for Eric Cantona to boot the ball into the net from the edge of the penalty area. Liverpool failed to even make a serious attempt to equalise and the trophy was won by their opponents for a record ninth time.

== Squad ==
Note: Flags indicate national team as defined under FIFA eligibility rules; some limited exceptions apply. Players may hold more than one non-FIFA nationality.

No.	Pos.	Nation	Player
1	GK	ENG	David James
2	DF	ENG	Rob Jones
4	DF	IRL	Jason McAteer (Note: McAteer was born in Tranmere, England, but also qualified to represent the Republic of Ireland internationally and made his international debut for the Republic of Ireland in March 1994.)
5	DF	ENG	Mark Wright
6	DF	IRL	Phil Babb (Note: Babb was born in Lambeth, England, but also qualified to represent the Republic of Ireland internationally and made his international debut for the Republic of Ireland in 1994.)
7	FW	ENG	Nigel Clough
8	FW	ENG	Stan Collymore
9	FW	WAL	Ian Rush
10	MF	ENG	John Barnes (Note: Barnes was born in Kingston, Jamaica, but also qualified to represent any of the home nations internationally as he held a British passport and made his international debut for England in May 1983.)
11	MF	ENG	Mark Walters
12	DF	ENG	John Scales
13	GK	DEN	Michael Stensgaard
14	MF	DEN	Jan Mølby

No.	Pos.	Nation	Player
15	MF	ENG	Jamie Redknapp
16	MF	ENG	Michael Thomas
17	MF	ENG	Steve McManaman
18	MF	ENG	Phil Charnock
19	MF	IRL	Mark Kennedy
20	DF	NOR	Stig Inge Bjørnebye
21	DF	ENG	Dominic Matteo (Note: Matteo was born in Dumfries, Scotland, but was raised in England from the age of four and represented them at U-21 and B level before making his international debut for Scotland in November 2000.)
22	DF	ENG	Steve Harkness
23	FW	ENG	Robbie Fowler
24	FW	WAL	Lee Jones
25	DF	ENG	Neil Ruddock
26	GK	ENG	Tony Warner (Note: Warner was born in Liverpool, England, but also qualified to represent Trinidad and Tobago internationally and would make his international debut for Trinidad and Tobago in February 2006.)
27	GK	ENG	Stephen Pears

== Transfers ==
=== In ===
#	Pos	Player	From	Fee	Date
8	FW	(England) Stan Collymore	(England) Nottingham Forest	£8,500,000	1 July 1995
27	GK	(England) Stephen Pears	(England) Middlesbrough	Free	14 August 1995
4	MF	(Republic of Ireland) Jason McAteer	(England) Bolton Wanderers	£4,500,000	7 September 1995

=== Out ===
#	Pos	Player	To	Fee	Date
11	MF	(England) Mark Walters	(England) Southampton	Free	17 January 1996
7	FW	(England) Nigel Clough	(England) Manchester City	£1,500,000	24 January 1996
14	MF	(Denmark) Jan Mølby	(Wales) Swansea City	Free	21 February 1996
8	FW	(England) Paul Stewart	(England) Sunderland	Free	5 March 1996
9	FW	(Wales) Ian Rush	(England) Leeds United	Free	20 May 1996

== Competitions ==
=== Premier League ===
==== League table ====
Pos	Team	Pld	W	D	L	GF	GA	GD	Pts	Qualification or relegation
1	Manchester United (C)	38	25	7	6	73	35	+38	82	Qualification for the Champions League group stage
2	Newcastle United	38	24	6	8	66	37	+29	78	Qualification for the UEFA Cup first round
3	Liverpool	38	20	11	7	70	34	+36	71	Qualification for the Cup Winners' Cup first round (Note: Liverpool qualified for the Cup Winners' Cup as FA Cup runners-up, as winners Manchester United already qualified for the Champions League. They defaulted their UEFA Cup spot from league position to Arsenal.)
4	Aston Villa	38	18	9	11	52	35	+17	63	Qualification for the UEFA Cup first round
5	Arsenal	38	17	12	9	49	32	+17	63	Qualification for the UEFA Cup first round

Source: Premier League
Rules for classification: 1) points; 2) goal difference; 3) number of goals scored.
(C) Champions

==== Results by round ====
Round	1	2	3	4	5	6	7	8	9	10	11	12	13	14	15	16	17	18	19	20	21	22	23	24	25	26	27	28	29	30	31	32	33	34	35	36	37	38
Ground	H	A	A	H	A	H	H	A	H	A	H	A	H	A	A	H	A	H	H	A	H	A	H	A	H	A	A	H	H	H	A	H	A	H	A	H	A	A
Result	W	L	W	W	L	W	W	D	D	W	W	L	L	D	L	D	W	W	W	D	W	D	W	W	D	W	W	W	D	W	L	W	L	W	D	W	D	D
Position	7	9	4	3	7	4	3	4	5	5	3	5	7	7	8	8	8	5	3	3	3	2	2	2	3	3	4	3	3	3	3	3	3	3	3	3	3	3

Source: Competitive Matches
A = Away; H = Home; W = Win; D = Draw; L = Loss

==== Matches ====
19 August 1995 1	Liverpool	1–0	Sheffield Wednesday	Liverpool
15:00	Collymore 61'	Report		Stadium: Anfield; Attendance: 40,535; Referee: Paul Durkin (Isle of Portland)

21 August 1995 (MNF) 2	Leeds United	1–0	Liverpool	Leeds
20:00	Yeboah 51'	Report		Stadium: Elland Road; Attendance: 35,852; Referee: David Elleray (Harrow)

26 August 1995 3	Tottenham Hotspur	1–3	Liverpool	Tottenham
15:00	Barnes 88' (o.g.)	Report	Barnes 7', 42'; Fowler 54'	Stadium: White Hart Lane; Attendance: 31,254; Referee: Keith Cooper (Pontypridd)

30 August 1995 4	Liverpool	1–0	Queens Park Rangers	Liverpool
19:45	Ruddock 29'	Report		Stadium: Anfield; Attendance: 37,548; Referee: Steve Dunn

9 September 1995 5	Wimbledon	1–0	Liverpool	South Norwood
15:00	V. Jones (red card) 23'; Babb 30' (o.g.)	Report		Stadium: Selhurst Park; Attendance: 19,530; Referee: Keith Burge (Tonypandy)

16 September 1995 6	Liverpool	3–0	Blackburn Rovers	Liverpool
15:00	Redknapp 12'; Fowler 22'; Collymore 29'	Report	Berg (yellow card) ?' (yellow-red card) 51'	Stadium: Anfield; Attendance: 39,502; Referee: Gary Willard

23 September 1995 7	Liverpool	5–2	Bolton Wanderers	Liverpool
15:00	Fowler 11', 30', 46', 67'; Harkness 83'	Report	Todd 77'; Patterson 81' (pen.)	Stadium: Anfield; Attendance: 40,104; Referee: Martin Bodenham

1 October 1995 (Super Sunday) 8	Manchester United	2–2	Liverpool	Trafford
16:00	Butt 2'; Cantona 71' (pen.)	Report	Fowler 32', 54'	Stadium: Old Trafford; Attendance: 34,934; Referee: David Elleray

14 October 1995 9	Liverpool	0–0	Coventry City	Liverpool
15:00		Report		Stadium: Anfield; Attendance: 39,079; Referee: Paul Danson

22 October 1995 (Super Sunday) 10	Southampton	1–3	Liverpool	Southampton
16:00	G. Watson 2'; Le Tissier (yellow card) ?' (yellow-red card) 68'	Report	McManaman 21', 54'; Redknapp 73'	Stadium: The Dell; Attendance: 15,245; Referee: Dermot Gallagher

28 October 1995 11	Liverpool	6–0	Manchester City	Liverpool
15:00	Rush 3', 64'; Redknapp 5'; Fowler 47', 60'; Ruddock 53'	Report		Stadium: Anfield; Attendance: 39,267; Referee: Alan Wilkie

4 November 1995 12	Newcastle United	2–1	Liverpool	Newcastle upon Tyne
15:00	Ferdinand 3'; S. Watson 90'	Report	Rush 11'	Stadium: St James' Park; Attendance: 36,547; Referee: Mike Reed

18 November 1995 13	Liverpool	1–2	Everton	Liverpool
15:00	Fowler 89'	Report	Kanchelskis 53', 65'	Stadium: Anfield; Attendance: 40,818; Referee: Gerald Ashby

22 November 1995 14	West Ham United	0–0	Liverpool	Upton Park
19:45		Report		Stadium: Boleyn Ground; Attendance: 24,324; Referee: Jeff Winter (Middlesbrough)

25 November 1995 15	Middlesbrough	2–1	Liverpool	Middlesbrough
15:00	Cox 2'; Barmby 66'	Report	Ruddock 54'	Stadium: Riverside Stadium; Attendance: 29,390; Referee: Dermot Gallagher

2 December 1995 16	Liverpool	1–1	Southampton	Liverpool
15:00	Collymore 67'	Report	Shipperley 60'	Stadium: Anfield; Attendance: 38,007; Referee: Robbie Hart (Darlington)

9 December 1995 17	Bolton Wanderers	0–1	Liverpool	Burnden
15:00		Report	Collymore 61'	Stadium: Burnden Park; Attendance: 21,042; Referee: Martin Bodenham

17 December 1995 (Super Sunday) 18	Liverpool	2–0	Manchester United	Liverpool
16:00	Fowler 45', 87'	Report		Stadium: Anfield; Attendance: 40,546; Referee: Graham Poll

23 December 1995 19	Liverpool	3–1	Arsenal	Liverpool
15:00	Fowler 40', 56', 78'	Report	Wright 8' (pen.)	Stadium: Anfield; Attendance: 39,806; Referee: Keith Cooper

30 December 1995 20	Chelsea	2–2	Liverpool	Fulham
15:00	Spencer 9', 45'	Report	McManaman 33', 76'	Stadium: Stamford Bridge; Attendance: 31,137; Referee: Keith Burge

1 January 1996 21	Liverpool	4–2	Nottingham Forest	Nottingham
	Fowler 21', 41'; Collymore 62'; Cooper 86' (o.g.)		Stone 13'; Woan 18'	Stadium: Anfield; Attendance: 39,206

13 January 1996 22	Sheffield Wednesday	1–1	Liverpool	Sheffield
	Kovačević 7'		Rush 87'	Stadium: Hillsborough; Attendance: 32,747

20 January 1996 23	Liverpool	5–0	Leeds United	Liverpool
	Ruddock 27', 90'; Fowler 62' (pen.), 68'; Collymore 89'			Stadium: Anfield; Attendance: 40,254

31 January 1996 24	Aston Villa	0–2	Liverpool	Aston
			Collymore 61'; Fowler 65'	Stadium: Villa Park; Attendance: 39,332

3 February 1996 25	Liverpool	0–0	Tottenham Hotspur	Liverpool
				Stadium: Anfield; Attendance: 40,628

11 February 1996 26	Queens Park Rangers	1–2	Liverpool	Shepherd's Bush
	Dichio 66'		M. Wright 13'; Fowler 30'	Stadium: Loftus Road; Attendance: 18,405

24 February 1996 27	Blackburn Rovers	2–3	Liverpool	Blackburn
	Wilcox 25'; Sherwood 83'		Collymore 10', 21'; Thomas 70'	Stadium: Ewood Park; Attendance: 30,895

3 March 1996 (Super Sunday) 28	Liverpool	3–0	Aston Villa	Liverpool
	McManaman 2'; Fowler 5', 8'			Stadium: Anfield; Attendance: 39,508

13 March 1996 29	Liverpool	2–2	Wimbledon	Liverpool
	McManaman 35'; Collymore 68'		Ekoku 54'; Holdsworth 60'	Stadium: Anfield; Attendance: 34,063

16 March 1996 30	Liverpool	2–0	Chelsea	Liverpool
	M. Wright 53'; Fowler 62'			Stadium: Anfield; Attendance: 40,820

23 March 1996 31	Nottingham Forest	1–0	Liverpool	Nottingham
	Stone 42'			Stadium: City Ground; Attendance: 29,058

3 April 1996 32	Liverpool	4–3	Newcastle United	Liverpool
	Fowler 2', 55'; Collymore 68', 90'		Ferdinand 10'; Ginola 14'; Asprilla 57'	Stadium: Anfield; Attendance: 40,702

6 April 1996 33	Coventry City	1–0	Liverpool	Hillfields
	Whelan 18'			Stadium: Highfield Road; Attendance: 23,137

8 April 1996 34	Liverpool	2–0	West Ham United	Liverpool
	Collymore 22'; Barnes 38'			Stadium: Anfield; Attendance: 40,326

16 April 1996 35	Everton	1–1	Liverpool	Walton
	Kanchelskis 18'		Fowler 87'	Stadium: Goodison Park; Attendance: 40,120

27 April 1996 36	Liverpool	1–0	Middlesbrough	Liverpool
	Collymore 70'			Stadium: Anfield; Attendance: 40,782

1 May 1996 37	Arsenal	0–0	Liverpool	London
				Stadium: Highbury; Attendance: 38,323

5 May 1996 38	Manchester City	2–2	Liverpool	Moss Side
	Rösler 71' (pen.); Symons 78'		Lomas 6' (o.g.); Rush 41'	Stadium: Maine Road; Attendance: 31,436

=== FA Cup ===
6 January 1996 Third round	Liverpool	7–0	Rochdale	Liverpool
	Fowler 21'; Collymore 43', 44', 70'; Valentine 48' (o.g.); Rush 61'; McAteer 85'	(Report)		Stadium: Anfield; Attendance: 28,126

18 February 1996 Fourth round	Shrewsbury Town	0–4	Liverpool	Shrewsbury
		(Report)	Collymore 8'; Walton 69' (o.g.); Fowler 75'; McAteer 84'	Stadium: Gay Meadow; Attendance: 7,752

28 February 1996 Fifth round	Liverpool	2–1	Charlton Athletic	Liverpool
	Fowler 12'; Collymore 59'	(Report)	Grant 87'	Stadium: Anfield; Attendance: 36,818

10 March 1996 Sixth round	Leeds United	0–0	Liverpool	Leeds
		(Report)		Stadium: Elland Road; Attendance: 24,632

20 March 1996 Sixth round replay	Liverpool	3–0	Leeds United	Liverpool
	McManaman 57', 73'; Fowler 83'	(Report)		Stadium: Anfield; Attendance: 30,812

31 March 1996 Semi-final	Liverpool	3–0	Aston Villa	Manchester
	Fowler 16', 86'; McAteer 90'	(Report)		Stadium: Old Trafford; Attendance: 39,072

11 May 1996 Final	Liverpool	0–1	Manchester United	London
		(Report)	Cantona 85'	Stadium: Wembley Stadium; Attendance: 79,007

=== Football League Cup ===
20 September 1995 Second round, first leg	Liverpool	2–0	Sunderland	Liverpool
19:45	McManaman 8'; Thomas 72'	Report		Stadium: Anfield; Attendance: 25,579; Referee: Peter Jones (Loughborough)

6 October 1995 Second round, second leg	Sunderland	0–1	Liverpool	Sunderland
19:45		Report	Fowler 39'	Stadium: Roker Park; Attendance: 20,560; Referee: Roger Dilkes (Mossley)

25 October 1995 Third round	Liverpool	4–0	Manchester City	Liverpool
19:45	Scales 9'; Fowler 74'; Rush 79'; Harkness 82'	Report		Stadium: Anfield; Attendance: 29,394; Referee: Stephen Lodge (Barnsley)

29 November 1995 Fourth round	Liverpool	0–1	Newcastle United	Liverpool
19:45		Report	Watson 77'	Stadium: Anfield; Attendance: 40,077; Referee: Paul Durkin (Isle of Portland)

=== UEFA Cup ===
12 September 1995 First round, first leg	Spartak Vladikavkaz (Russia)	1–2	(England) Liverpool	Vladikavkaz
	Qosimov 20'	Report	McManaman 32'; Redknapp 52'	Stadium: Republican Spartak Stadium; Attendance: 43,000; Referee: Rémi Harrel (France)

26 September 1995 First round, second leg	Liverpool (England)	0–0	(Russia) Spartak Vladikavkaz	Liverpool
		Report		Stadium: Anfield; Attendance: 35,042; Referee: Jiří Ulrich (Czech Republic)

13 October 1995 Second round, first leg	Brøndby IF (Denmark)	0–0	(England) Liverpool	Brøndby Municipality
		Report		Stadium: Brøndby Stadium; Attendance: 37,648; Referee: Jaap Uilenberg (Netherlands)

31 October 1995 Second Round, Second Leg	Liverpool (England)	0–1	(Denmark) Brøndby IF	Liverpool
		Report	Eggen 78'	Stadium: Anfield; Attendance: 35,878; Referee: Karol Ihring (Slovakia)

== Statistics ==
=== Appearances and goals ===
No.	Pos	Nat	Player	Total		Premier League		FA Cup		League Cup		UEFA Cup	
No.	Pos	Nat	Player	Apps	Goals	Apps	Goals	Apps	Goals	Apps	Goals	Apps	Goals
Goalkeepers
1	GK	(England) ENG	David James	53	0	38	0	7	0	4	0	4	0
Defenders
2	DF	(England) ENG	Rob Jones	47	0	33	0	7	0	3	0	4	0
5	DF	(England) ENG	Mark Wright	42	2	28	2	7	0	3	0	4	0
6	DF	(Republic of Ireland) IRL	Phil Babb	40	0	28	0	4	0	4	0	4	0
12	DF	(England) ENG	John Scales	38	1	27	0	7	0	2	1	2	0
20	DF	(Norway) NOR	Stig Inge Bjørnebye	2	0	2	0	0	0	0	0	0	0
21	DF	(England) ENG	Dominic Matteo	6	0	5	0	0+1	0	0	0	0	0
22	DF	(England) ENG	Steve Harkness	33	2	23+1	1	1	0	4	1	4	0
25	DF	(England) ENG	Neil Ruddock	28	5	18+2	5	2	0	3+1	0	2	0
Midfielders
4	MF	(Republic of Ireland) IRL	Jason McAteer	40	3	27+2	0	7	3	3+1	0	0	0
10	MF	(England) ENG	John Barnes	50	3	36	3	7	0	3	0	4	0
15	MF	(England) ENG	Jamie Redknapp	33	4	19+4	3	2+1	0	3	0	4	1
16	MF	(England) ENG	Michael Thomas	37	2	18+9	1	5+1	0	0+1	1	2+1	0
17	MF	(England) ENG	Steve McManaman	53	10	38	6	7	2	4	1	4	1
19	MF	(Republic of Ireland) IRL	Mark Kennedy	6	0	1+3	0	0	0	0+1	0	0+1	0
Forwards
8	FW	(England) ENG	Stan Collymore	44	19	30+1	14	7	5	2+2	0	1+1	0
9	FW	(Wales) WAL	Ian Rush	29	7	10+10	5	0+4	1	2	1	2+1	0
23	FW	(England) ENG	Robbie Fowler	53	36	36+2	28	7	6	4	2	3+1	0
Players transferred out during the season
7	FW	(England) ENG	Nigel Clough	2	0	1+1	0	0	0	0	0	0	0

Last updated: 30 May 1996
Source: Competitions

=== Competition top scorers ===
Competition	Result	Top scorer
Premier League	3rd	(England) Robbie Fowler, 28
UEFA Cup	Second round	(England) Steve McManaman, 1 (England) Jamie Redknapp, 1
FA Cup	Runners-up	(England) Robbie Fowler, 6
League Cup	Fourth round	(England) Robbie Fowler, 2
Overall		(England) Robbie Fowler, 36
