= Steve McManaman =

English footballer (born 1972)

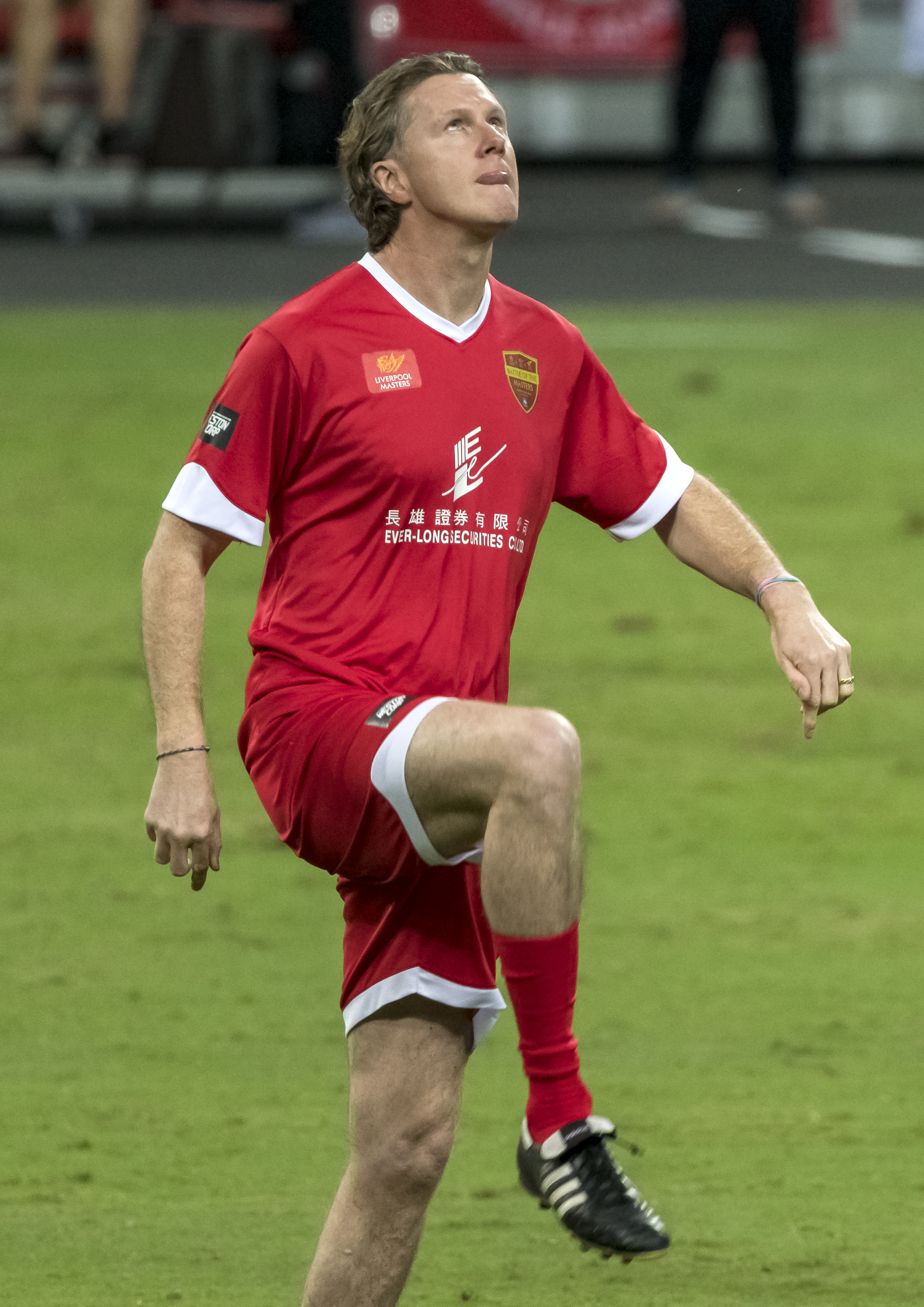
- McManaman in 2017

Personal information
- Full name: Steven McManaman
- Date of birth: 11 February 1972 (age 54)
- Place of birth: Bootle, Lancashire, England
- Height: 6 ft 0 in (1.83 m)
- Position: Winger

Youth career
- 1988–1990: Liverpool

Senior career*
Years	Team	Apps	(Gls)
1990–1999	Liverpool	272	(46)
1999–2003	Real Madrid	94	(8)
2003–2005	Manchester City	35	(0)
Total		401	(54)

International career
1991	England U19	2	(0)
1990–1993	England U21	7	(1)
1994–2001	England	37	(3)
- * Club domestic league appearances and goals

Steven McManaman (born 11 February 1972) is an English former professional footballer who played as a winger. He is one of the most decorated English footballers to have played for a club abroad, with the UEFA website stating in 2012 that "of all England's footballing exports in the modern era, none was as successful as McManaman".

During his nine years at Liverpool where he was the club's talisman from the mid-1990s until his departure, McManaman won the FA Cup and League Cup, while individually, he was the Premier League's top assist provider for the 1995–96 season and was named in the PFA Team of the Year for the 1996–97 season. His influence on games was such that for opposition managers it was a case of "stop McManaman, you stop Liverpool". In 2026 McManaman was listed at number 38 in an official club poll of Liverpool's greatest players, with the club's site regarding "McManaman and fellow Scouser Robbie Fowler as the spearheads of a hugely entertaining team."

With contract negotiations over a new Liverpool deal floundering, McManaman moved to Real Madrid in 1999, with the transfer becoming one of the most high-profile Bosman free transfers of all time. Amongst his accomplishments with Madrid, he won La Liga and the UEFA Champions League twice, becoming the first English player to win the latter trophy with a non-English club, and later became the first English player to win it for the second time. An early Galáctico, he won eight trophies and played in 11 cup finals in four years and made the semi-finals of the Champions League in each of his four years at the club. He went on to play two seasons at Manchester City before retiring in 2005.

Since his retirement, McManaman works as a co-commentator on ESPN and TNT Sports (formerly BT Sport)'s football coverage, as well acting as a La Liga ambassador. He previously worked as a football pundit for Setanta Sports.

== Early life ==
Steven McManaman was born on 11 February 1972 in Bootle, Lancashire. He grew up as an Everton supporter, with his boyhood heroes in football being the Everton players Bob Latchford and Duncan McKenzie. However, when Everton offered the player a two-year contract, after McManaman had made a name for himself at tournaments for school and around Merseyside, McManaman's father rejected it in favour of a schoolboy contract and two-year apprenticeship offer from Liverpool (through scout Jim Aspinall and then-manager Kenny Dalglish). McManaman signed as a 16-year-old apprentice upon leaving school in 1988. As an apprentice, McManaman was under the mentorship of John Barnes and many regarded McManaman as a player who could potentially replace Barnes in the future. McManaman was said to be a natural athlete; having been a cross country champion at school level.

== Club career ==
=== Liverpool ===
==== 1990–1993: Early years ====
McManaman developed through the youth scheme at Liverpool and signed as a full professional on 19 February 1990 in what was to be Kenny Dalglish's final full season as manager. On 15 December 1990, McManaman made his Liverpool debut under Dalglish as a substitute for Peter Beardsley in the Football League First Division in a 2–0 league win over Sheffield United at Anfield. By the following season, Dalglish had been replaced by Graeme Souness as manager. On 17 August 1991, he made his full debut in a 2–1 win over Oldham Athletic. This was a game in which The Guardian reported that McManaman "ran his legs into the ground" all day and assisted his mentor John Barnes in scoring the late winner by flicking on Mark Walters' cross. McManaman scored his first ever professional goal with a diving header four days later on 21 August 1991, in a 2–1 away defeat to Manchester City.

The 19-year-old McManaman quickly became a regular first team player in the 1991–92 season, making 51 appearances in total in only his first full season. It was suggested that opportunities in the first team had come as a result of then manager Graeme Souness' decision to sell several ageing players. Moreover, McManaman also found opportunities in the first team as John Barnes had suffered a career threatening achilles tendon injury. McManaman was deployed as a left-sided or right-sided forward, backing the club's new signing Dean Saunders. This was a move which Saunders reluctantly accepted at first, having realised that Souness "had [no choice but] to bring kids like McManaman into the team before they were properly ready." Saunders however began to change his mind as the season progressed following his observance of McManaman's ability to form an attacking partnership with him, with McManaman managing to create and score several goals across the league and in the side's run to the quarter-finals of the UEFA Cup, as well as in the FA Cup. On 9 May 1992, McManaman started in the 1992 FA Cup final as Liverpool defeated Sunderland with a score of 2–0. He was also named the man of the match, having set up the winning goal for Michael Thomas, despite being the youngest player on the pitch. McManaman's performances saw him described by Ian Rush as the most promising young player at Liverpool at the time.

==== 1993–1995: Success and first widespread fame ====
Although McManaman had a couple of quieter seasons with the advent of the Premier League, in which Liverpool initially struggled, he continued to develop a reputation as one of English football's two best emerging young wingers alongside Ryan Giggs of Manchester United. A BBC article described the pair as able to "embarrass defences with their mazy runs, which too often lack the finishing touch they deserve".

In the 1993–94 season, McManaman showed fine form with two goals against Swindon Town and some assists including a spectacular run and assist against Tottenham Hotspur. However, this form faltered following a drop in confidence after an incident with Bruce Grobbelaar towards the end of a Merseyside derby, when the players exchanged blows after Grobelaar lambasted McManaman for a poor clearance which led to a goal being conceded (an incident later named as one of the top five bust-ups between teammates in Premier League history).

At the beginning of the 1994–95 season, McManaman signed a new million-pound contract, and was given a central, freer role by new manager Roy Evans, who wanted to utilise McManaman's natural running and dribbling ability to drift all over the park. It proved a successful decision as McManaman began mesmerising defences with runs that were later to become hallmarks of the Liverpool side of the 1990s. The 1994–95 season also proved to be a turning point for Liverpool after the lack of success during the previous two seasons. That season, he collected a League Cup winner's medal after scoring twice in his side's 2–1 win over Bolton Wanderers; such was his performance that fans named it "The McManaman Final". For his second Wembley final appearance in succession he was awarded man of the match, earning the Alan Hardaker Trophy and a tribute from guest of honour, celebrated veteran winger Stanley Matthews, who had a personal word with McManaman before the final, saying: "I like the way you dribble," adding [to the press] after the final, "He reminds me of me when I was playing ... I wish there are more dribblers like him." In 2024, FourFourTwo magazine placed McManaman's performance in the final at number 87 on a list of the Top 100 best individual performances in all of modern football history.

By the end of 1995–96, McManaman was top of the Premier League goal assists chart with 25 assists over the season (15 in the Premier League), including assists and top ratings in a match against Newcastle United voted the best of the decade in the Premier League 10 Seasons Awards. By now, McManaman was ranked as one of the finest midfielders in England and had developed a strong reputation on the European stage following UEFA Euro 1996, earning praise from many at the time including Kevin Keegan, who said "there are few finer sights in world football than the sight of Steve McManaman running down the length of the pitch".

==== 1995–1997: Consistency and success ====
McManaman had also been noted for his versatility in his free role, switching from right to left wings, and his ability to play in central midfield, behind the front pair, or as a forward. McManaman was credited for making the free role that manager Evans gave him work, with the result being that Liverpool were playing some of the most aesthetically pleasing attacking football at the time in England. McManaman was also said to have been one of only a handful of so-called "talismanic" players along with Eric Cantona and Gianfranco Zola in the league at the time believed to have the charisma to lift supporters from their seats each time they got the ball.

From 1996 through 1998, McManaman consistently won several 'Man of the Match' awards, and Premier League managers were forced to deploy a man-marker specifically to follow him for an entire game. The then Middlesbrough manager, Bryan Robson, was quoted as saying that "everyone in the Premiership knows that if you stop McManaman, you stop Liverpool". According to interviews on an ITV documentary titled The Alex Ferguson Story (1998), Peter Schmeichel stated that Alex Ferguson was also tactically fixated on stopping McManaman each time Manchester United played Liverpool, with Schmeichel adding Ferguson was so concerned about stopping McManaman dictating the play; it became "Groundhog Team Talk": "We've heard it every time we're playing Liverpool—McManaman's doing this ... We know that," said Schmeichel, while Ferguson himself told his players: "We lost the league (title in 1994–95) at Anfield by not listening to instructions about McManaman..."

==== 1997–1998: Contract wrangles ====
In August 1997, Liverpool, having been unable to agree a new contract with McManaman and fearing that the player might leave on a Bosman free transfer, finally accepted a £12 million bid for the player from Barcelona; Barcelona had previously tried (and failed) to sign McManaman twice before (after the 1996 FA Cup final and after Euro 96). The deal subsequently fell apart amidst recriminations about the player's remuneration demands and Barcelona's motives for the bid, being in negotiation with Brazilian superstar Rivaldo at the same time and snubbing McManaman when he travelled to Spain to meet them.

At its height, the transfer saga was dubbed by the International Herald Tribune (later acquired by The New York Times) as one that ushered in a "new low in transfer trading tactics"; adding that McManaman was a pawn being "used" as the big clubs battled. By the end of the saga, Barcelona had signed Rivaldo after Bobby Robson changed his mind (he had earlier told LFC vice-chairman Peter Robinson that he wanted the player) and intervened and told Louis van Gaal that he decided McManaman was "a cosmetic player who would not score 18 goals a season for Barcelona", while McManaman himself, albeit expressing that he was surprised Liverpool were willing to sell him, stated that he had no desire to leave Liverpool and reiterated his former position in February 1997 - that he would not leave Liverpool no matter what unless the club ever decided to sell him, and with two years left on his contract was simply not in any rush to sign a new one - as cover for his waiting on the management and board to offer him the right contractual terms on a new deal. A subsequent bid of £11 million from Serie A club Juventus in November of the same year was rejected by both club and player.

In early 1998, Barcelona returned with yet another bid for McManaman, and former Deportivo La Coruña president Augusto César Lendoiro later added that Barcelona did not want to sign his former player Rivaldo and that they had (initially) wanted McManaman, and put it down to a "coincidence" that they pulled out and opted for Rivaldo instead, with it being notable that the fact Barcelona came back again in 1998 (after having already signed Rivaldo five months earlier) had stood as evidence of that point. Nonetheless, McManaman and Liverpool turned them down once and for all for the last time.

McManaman had been named Liverpool stand-in captain at the start of the 1997–98 season, but contract negotiations continued to flounder as the club could not match the sums available to McManaman if he left as a free agent at the end of the following campaign. Having been overlooked by Glenn Hoddle for the 1998 FIFA World Cup starting lineup, denounced in the English media as being greedy (due to the FC Barcelona fiasco) and bolstered by advice from the likes of fellow professionals Paul Ince, Paul Gascoigne, David Platt and Chris Waddle, McManaman publicly announced his desire to play abroad, explaining: "I have always said I would love the chance to play abroad and now that chance has come along. When you have a chance to join clubs who are involved in the Champions' League every season, you have to consider it...I'm sure everyone must see the logic in that."

Numerous European clubs circled the soon-to-be free agent, with Juventus again back in the fray amid huge media speculation, but La Liga club Real Madrid soon emerged in November through December 1998 as his most likely destination. In January 1999, it was reported that McManaman was talking to Real with the player reportedly offered £60,000 a week and nearly £2 million as a signing-on fee. On 30 January, McManaman passed a medical and signed an official pre-contract with the club which would make him the best-paid British footballer to date. He declined to pose in a Real Madrid shirt at the contract signing event, out of respect for Liverpool's fans.

McManaman's image of being a contract rebel and mercenary at the time was also exacerbated by his involvement in a year-long dispute between 1997 and 1998 with Umbro, his football boot sponsor. Umbro sued him for breach of contract for knowingly wearing Reebok branded boots in contravention of the deal, and deliberately "blacking out" their logo on his boots in protest. McManaman argued that his contract was unenforceable and an unlawful restraint of trade. McManaman said that he was being exploited in that he was being held and tied to a boot deal he had signed back when he was a mere teenager. McManaman's agent during the 1990s, Simon Fuller and 19 Management—of which McManaman was his first football client—helped him negotiate a settlement. The court initially ordered McManaman to fulfil his contract, plus an undertaking to pay Umbro's legal costs for launching contempt of court proceedings against him in 1997, which McManaman accepted and apologised for. A year on, however, McManaman continued to dishonour the deal. He finally won an out-of-court settlement in October 1998, freeing him to negotiate with other companies for what he regarded as remuneration appropriate to his status.

==== 1998–1999: Final season at Liverpool ====
Having signed the pre-contract with Real Madrid, McManaman still had five months left on his contract at Liverpool. New manager Gérard Houllier, who had replaced Roy Evans as full coach following the failure of their joint-managerial role that very season, was widely believed to want to get rid of the "Spice Boys" mentality and cavalier attitudes at the club, having told many players they were surplus to requirements (including Jason McAteer, Phil Babb, Rob Jones, Stig Inge Bjørnebye, David James and Paul Ince), and where there were exits for seventeen other players who would leave the club in the next year ahead. While stating that he would have preferred that the player stayed, he said that the club had to respect McManaman's decision to exercise his right to leave at the end of his contract and conceded that he would have to replace the player, ultimately stating that McManaman's departure was inevitable and the only chance of keeping him would be if he (McManaman) decided to sign a 12-month contract extension having failed to secure a move to the club of his choice, saying: "If I was the manager of Real Madrid—or Barcelona or any leading club—I would want to have Steve McManaman in my side," he said.

Reports also emerged at the time stating that McManaman's decision making process was significantly shaped by Roy Evans' complete departure from the club in mid-November 1998, as Liverpool would be commencing on a new era and tactical style under Houllier and it dovetailed with McManaman's desire to time his move that year, rather than to sign an extension and move a year later.

Jamie Carragher defended McManaman in his autobiography, stating that at the time: "Despite being accused of greed, Macca also lost money to secure the move. He was one of the lowest earners at Anfield (for years), despite being the top player, because he'd refused to sign a new contract. Financially he took a big risk, putting his career before money. I respect him for that." Another of McManaman's younger teammates, David Thompson, also said (in an interview in 2019) that McManaman was the best player in that 1990s Liverpool team, but was playing as the playmaker of the side on a lower salary than even new foreign signings who came in on higher wage contracts at the time.

McManaman also stated that his decision to move abroad was something he had wanted to do for a long time and not for financial reasons alone, telling the magazine 90 Minutes that it was about the allure of Real Madrid and Alfredo Di Stéfano, Ferenc Puskás and Madrid's legacy, as well as the desire to test himself in the Champions League.

In 2021, McManaman finally shed new light on his decision to leave Liverpool back in 1999, stating that a combination of factors including being underappreciated at Liverpool – having not been offered the right contractual deal (as the club presumed on his staying on indefinitely simply because he was a local talent thus only sanctioning higher offers commensurate with his true value when they realised he would actually leave); and that the club were poor in communicating and handling his matters including selling him to FC Barcelona (without consulting him at all) – were all behind his decision back then. These were details which McManaman had never personally revealed publicly prior; and for over 20 years (arguably for confidentiality purposes and to protect the club's reputation).

At the time, in McManaman's final games for the club in the 1998–99 season, he began turning in mixed performances, with the media accusing him of playing out his final season in a "desultory manner". His form dipped at times, largely due to a combination of injuries (his first recurrent achilles injuries for over five years having set in after years of playing constantly)—where he had already missed an entire month from mid-November, only to return and reluctantly limp off the pitch (as captain) following a tackle by future Liverpool player Dietmar Hamann on his return game on Boxing Day (another compound injury that sidelined him for another month). Other factors for his loss of form included his later being restricted to substitute appearances (as Houllier wanted to cut the side's dependency on his gameplay and replace him,) as well as suffering a loss of confidence in certain games where even the home fans turned against him over the contract debacle, with some labelling him a "traitor" and a Judas figure.

Nonetheless, Houllier also avoided dropping McManaman entirely from the squad and gave him the chance to play. Houllier stated: "Macca had decided to leave, that's why he didn't sign the year before. When I arrived it was his final year and I didn't want to punish him in any way for that, although I might have done with another player. It was not my fault Macca left. You never want your top players to leave the club. He went on a free under a new rule at the time and you have to live with that sometimes. I would have tried hard to sign him before he was able to leave, that's why I was fair to him. I wasn't going to prejudice the matter by not playing him; he played until the end of the season and I asked the fans to give him a great send off in the final game against Wimbledon." McManaman himself also credited Houllier for his kindness during what ultimately was a difficult period, adding: "...it was a difficult situation for the pair of us, so I've got nothing but respect for the way he acted."

The Guardian reported on how divided the Liverpool fans were about McManaman's departure: "At the age of 27 McManaman is articulate enough to appeal to his public's elders, pretty enough to disrupt the thought patterns of the girls and good enough at his job to be regarded as a role model for the lads...on the face of it his crime is simply to be young, successful, in demand and wise enough to have surrounded himself with advisers who fully appreciate his true value. Before and during Saturday's game at Anfield he was subjected to some frightful abuse, accused by supporters of both teams of being a "greedy bastard"...It is wholly dependent upon your standpoint as to whether McManaman is a sporting trail-blazer enjoying the benefits of a free market or the very personification of the greed which many would argue has devalued football in recent times." At the time, McManaman also suffered personal tragedy when his mother Irene died aged 50 after a long battle with cancer.

The combination of all these factors meant McManaman suffered a loss of form; however, McManaman managed to rally and pick up his play right at the end of that last campaign. McManaman scored a crucial goal away at Blackburn Rovers, set up a dramatic stoppage-time equaliser with a through-ball for Paul Ince to score in front of the Kop against Manchester United, and scored the winner with a "scorching drive" to complete the full turn around result against Tottenham Hotspur after trailing 2–0 at half-time. In what was the final match of the season, and what would be McManaman's final match and final contribution on the pitch for the club, McManaman assisted Karl-Heinz Riedle with a goal at the Kop with a trademark right-wing run and pull back as Liverpool won 3–0 against Wimbledon, enabling McManaman to end his career at the club to a standing ovation, a lap of honour at Anfield, and a two-row squad farewell at the entrance of the players' tunnel.

=== Real Madrid ===
==== 1999–2000: Champions League victory ====
"…as Steve McManaman was unveiled at a press conference at the Bernabeu stadium, a mile up the road Clarence Seedorf was explaining his part in a dressing-room altercation with Fernando Hierro… The Madrid newspapers had carried a word-by-word and blow-by-blow account of the spat that morning. Pitched unwittingly into the mayhem, McManaman must feel as if he has left the Spice Boys for Oasis."

— Andrew Longmore of The Independent on McManaman's arrival in Madrid.

On 1 July 1999, after making 364 appearances and scoring 66 goals for Liverpool, McManaman transferred to La Liga club Real Madrid as Guus Hiddink's last signing for the club. The transfer came before the dismissal of Hiddink and also came while the club was under president Lorenzo Sanz. Prior to the arrival of McManaman, Real Madrid was described as undergoing a management and debt crisis. Forward Raúl told the press that the dressing room was "a cesspit of lies, treachery and whispers" and commented that he felt "sorry for new players like Steve McManaman coming into the club". Raúl added that "[if] McManaman thinks he is coming to one of the world's top clubs then he has made a big mistake." Previously, Real Madrid had appointed John Toshack as its new coach and had been obliged to sell influential players such as Predrag Mijatović, Davor Šuker and Christian Panucci due to mounting debt, while Clarence Seedorf was later released shortly after McManaman arrived.

McManaman's transfer saw him become only the second English player to ever play for the club after Laurie Cunningham had played for them in the 1980s. He became the first-ever player from the Premier League to move to play for Madrid and was also the most high-profile English footballer to move for Spanish football since Gary Lineker had moved to Barcelona from Everton in 1986. When McManaman first arrived, he admitted an initial struggle with loneliness, and spoke at the time of retired former Liverpool player Michael Robinson being his mentor. Robinson had likewise moved to Spain to play football and had cultivated a media career there.

Following a successful pre-season with the Madrid team in Switzerland and Italy, McManaman and his teammates returned to Spain. McManaman proved immediately to be popular with Real Madrid's supporters at the Santiago Bernabéu Stadium after scoring three times and creating several goals in his first few pre-season games for Los Merengues. On 22 August 1999, McManaman made his debut for Real Madrid in a 2–1 win over Mallorca at the Son Moix stadium in Mallorca, where he assisted Fernando Morientes in scoring a stoppage-time equaliser and thus enabling Madrid to go on to win 2–1 with seconds remaining.

"I thought McManaman was excellent...there is no question he was man of the match...He was a threat all night and gave Real great penetration from midfield. The boy has always been blessed with marvellous stamina and he has the confidence to go past players."

— Alex Ferguson on McManaman's performance in the 2000 UEFA Champions League final.

On 29 August 1999, McManaman scored his first goal for the club on his home debut in a 4–1 victory over Numancia at home. From December 1999 to January 2000, McManaman and the Madrid team took part in the controversial inaugural FIFA Club World Championships in Rio de Janeiro, where McManaman missed a stoppage-time chance to win a game against Necaxa and then also missed the penalty kick that would have sent Madrid into third place. Following this tournament, McManaman and the team returned to Spain and established themselves as a strong European side under new coach Vicente del Bosque, who had replaced John Toshack in November. McManaman's form in the run-in for the Champions League title saw him receive several man of the match awards, forming a productive midfield partnership with Fernando Redondo, as Madrid beat title defenders Manchester United and Bayern Munich to reach the final. On 24 May 2000 in the Champions League final at the Stade de France, Paris, McManaman arguably experienced his finest moment as a professional footballer, scoring a spectacular volley in a 3–0 victory over Valencia. His performance on the greatest of club football stages saw him hailed as the man of the match by the English press, a view endorsed by his Madrid teammate Iván Helguera. McManaman's part in Madrid's eighth European Cup win also saw him become the first English player ever to win Europe's premier club competition with a foreign club.

==== 2000–01: Fortitude in Madrid ====
Despite the Champions League final performance and having established himself as a valuable player in his first year in Madrid (including being listed alongside Fernando Redondo in Real Madrid's technical director Pirri's end of season official report as one of the two "untouchables" around whom the team should be built for the coming campaign), the arrival of a new club president in Florentino Pérez, closely followed by former Barcelona superstar midfielder Luís Figo in a club-record transfer, saw the club forced to sell several key players to reduce debt. McManaman, alongside Redondo, Nicolas Anelka and Christian Karembeu, was suddenly told that he was surplus to requirements before the start of the 2000–01 season and would be sold. When McManaman refused to leave unlike the others, manager Vicente del Bosque told McManaman that he had "little chance of playing this year", and in case he did not understand his position, the club also declined to give him a squad number for the forthcoming season. With the club already in debt, and having just spent another £37 million on Figo, the board were keen to cash in on McManaman and remove his $4.5 million salary from the wage bill. McManaman, however, with an iron-clad contract until 2004, declined to leave and instead stated his determination to win back his place in the team.

McManaman was left out of Real Madrid's squad for the 2000 UEFA Super Cup. Real Madrid subsequently accepted first an [£11 million bid from Middlesbrough and then a £12 million bid for McManaman from Chelsea that included the exchange of Tore André Flo, in the summer of 2000, both of which the player rejected. A Sky Sports report in August 2000 also stated that eight other clubs were vying for his signature at the time, including Manchester United, Parma and Fiorentina. Alex Ferguson declared his admiration for McManaman by arranging a contingent to convince him to sign. McManaman, however, said he wanted to succeed in Spain. His stance was rewarded when Real relented after a Spanish poll in El Mundo showed 90% of the fans wanted the club to keep McManaman, while Míchel Salgado complained to the management about the way McManaman was treated after McManaman turned down again another transfer attempt, this time to Lazio, who came in with an £8 million offer. In September of that year, several Real Madrid first-team stars were reported as having taken up a dressing room revolt collectively for McManaman and went to speak to Del Bosque directly. The Guardian reported that a Marca article had one prominent player stating: "We cannot stand by while this is happening. What happened to Redondo happened — well in the end Fernando had a good offer — but McManaman, what has Macca done to deserve the treatment he is getting from the manager?...[McManaman has been] treated with disrespect and is being humiliated—for no reason at all."

An El País report in early September 2000 reported Del Bosque as being sympathetic (albeit the fact that his hands were tied) concerning McManaman with Del Bosque saying: "I expected the audience to be affectionate with McManaman because he is a player very dear here. We will try to unite Real Madrid through the game although there are sectors that think more about those who are not." McManaman meanwhile was adamant that even if the situation to get him to leave was created around him, no one from the club's hierarchy ever told him to leave to his face, with the Spanish press even expressing the strange paradox of the whole situation by revealing that Del Bosque had actually rated McManaman highly and was quoted as saying: "Steve es el que entiende mejor cómo quiero que juguemos" ("Steve is the player in the team who best understands how I want us to play").

Real Madrid's hierarchy's change toward McManaman began when Del Bosque gave him his first appearance of the 2000–01 season as a substitute in a 3–3 draw against Málaga in mid-September. McManaman reportedly won over the manager by October and managed to feature in two-thirds of the club's matches, becoming a first-team regular for the remainder of the campaign—holding the unique distinction of being described as the only top-class football player from England playing overseas at the time. McManaman was also primarily deployed as a left-winger in this season (with Figo on the right), with the press noting that "the 'telepathy' McManaman and Roberto Carlos displayed down Madrid's left flank flummoxed almost every team they played." McManaman shone in this second season as Madrid advanced to the semi-finals of the Champions League (only to lose to eventual winners Bayern Munich), and won their 28th La Liga crown by a seven-point margin over the previous season's champions, Deportivo La Coruña; the club's first La Liga title in four years, with McManaman recording eight assists, and making 42 appearances in all competitions that year despite missing the first two months of the season.

==== 2001–02: Second Champions League ====
Eventually, the Board, including Florentino Pérez, relented, declaring that a "man like that would always have a place in my club", adding that "McManaman is in now in the team because his behaviour has been in accordance with the true values of the club". Johan Cruyff described McManaman at the time as the most useful player in the Galácticos because he was el socio del todos ("everyone's best partner on the pitch"). McManaman's partnership role functioned as one of a "perpetual motion style (that) moved defenders out of position and allowed the (Galatico) superstars to flourish".

A further honour was also extended on the pitch by the club in December 2002, whereas part of Madrid's Centenary Celebrations, McManaman was made the first Englishman to captain Real Madrid in a game against a FIFA World XI, to the applause of the ultras, with whom he had always been a cult favourite, and where the group is sometimes also known as the Ultra South (or "Ultrasurs").

Another great moment in the white of Madrid took place in the 2002 UEFA Champions League semi-final against Barcelona at the Camp Nou on 23 April 2002. In this match of huge proportions, due to El Clásico being a massive game in its own right, but also the fact that it was a Champions League semi-final, McManaman appeared as a second-half substitute to score a critical goal in second-half stoppage time to secure a 2–0 first-leg advantage, chipping over goalkeeper Roberto Bonano after being played in by Flávio Conceição, after Zidane had scored the first goal on 55 minutes. After the game Jorge Valdano added: "McManaman? McManaman is connected to everybody. A football match is a game of little societies and McManaman is a member of them all." This notable victory, Real's first at the Camp Nou since 1993, helped secure their place in the final of the 2002 Champions League at Hampden Park, Glasgow, where McManaman came on as a replacement for Figo on the hour mark – and thereby ensuring his second Champions League winners' medal, after Madrid secured a 2–1 victory over German team Bayer Leverkusen.

==== 2002–03: Final season ====
McManaman was used as a late substitute for games at the start of the campaign and after scoring a goal and assisting in a couple of new signing Ronaldo's goals he was given surprise starts. In one of his starts, he scored a brace against AEK Athens in the Champions League. McManaman also started in a game in 2003 in which Madrid were beaten 4–3 at Old Trafford against Manchester United in the Champions' League, even as Ronaldo hit a hat-trick. Nonetheless, after only playing 21 games of which he started only nine times, and making a meagre 15 appearances in La Liga, questions constantly arose throughout the season about McManaman's ability and reasons for staying in Spain considering his diminished role, lack of first-team action and international attention. Suggestions that McManaman had "sold out" for money and had grown indifferent and lackadaisical to his football were rampant in the British Press, while Ian Farrell, writing in When Saturday Comes, described the British press as suffering from "a selective media amnesia over McManaman's time in Spain". Nonetheless, McManaman managed to pick up a second La Liga medal for the year and was in the squad that won the Intercontinental Cup in Japan.

At the start of the 2003–04 pre-season, the signing of fellow Englishman David Beckham proved the last straw in eventually forcing McManaman down the pecking order at Real Madrid. McManaman remained with the club for its full pre-season, even after coach Vicente del Bosque was dismissed a day after having won the club's latest La Liga title, but in the close season, and the arrival of Carlos Queiroz as the new coach, McManaman was released by the club after helping Beckham with the language and to settle in, despite Beckham's pleas with the management for McManaman to remain.

=== Manchester City ===
==== 2003–2004: Arrival and impressive performances ====
In 2003–04, along with Madrid teammates Claude Makélélé, Fernando Hierro, and Fernando Morientes, McManaman headed back to the Premier League. Initially reported to be joining Arsenal or Everton, McManaman eventually decided to join long-time admirer Kevin Keegan on 30 August at Manchester City, resulting in a reunion with several ex-colleagues including Robbie Fowler, Nicolas Anelka, and later, David James, prompting the media to state that Keegan was "reuniting the Spice Boys".

McManaman made his debut on 14 September 2003 in a 4–1 win over Aston Villa at the City of Manchester Stadium, and quickly showed good early form with the club starting with a run of wins and progressing in the UEFA Cup, with McManaman hailed by Keegan to great hype, but by Christmas that year, results had fallen, the team languished and ended the season, well out of European contention, and McManaman injured again. By 2004–05, McManaman's time at City was ultimately deemed a disappointment and he was increasingly vilified by City fans, who later jeered him off the pitch following a draw with Norwich City.

==== 2004–2005: Loss of form and departure ====
On the pitch, a combination of niggling injuries (including a long-term achilles problem not dissipating) and the rise of an in-form and up-and-coming Shaun Wright-Phillips saw him lose his preferred right midfield position. When McManaman did play, he failed to rediscover his old form and speed, only occasionally demonstrating the ability he had shown in his earlier career. Part of the problem stemmed from the fact that to find a role at Madrid he had changed his playing style, cutting down on the flair play (as Madrid had a surfeit of flair players) and instead focusing on being a holding player and making short, simple passes of the ball in central midfield, where he was known for his one-touch passing and ability to never give the ball away.

In February 2004, McManaman was criticised by Alex Ferguson after an FA Cup Manchester derby at Old Trafford for "intimidating Gary Neville" to get him sent off in a headbutt incident, adding a derogatory comment that he had no idea what other role McManaman had in the game [and possibly for Manchester City].

Off the field at City, Fowler and McManaman were caught up in a sex scandal that appeared in the News of the World following a failed attempt by the pair to gain an injunction to prevent publication, costing them £50,000 in addition to making the case look like an invariable admission of guilt. The court case came soon after football's "roasting" and rape allegations at Chelsea earlier that year and served only to exacerbate their situations and affected their reputations off and on the pitch at the club, while an incident involving Fowler and McManaman and three other players deliberately missing the team bus at Leicester also did not go down well with the fans, manager and media.

In 2004, McManaman was linked to the MetroStars, who confirmed that the club were interested in him. However, they eventually decided to relinquish their bid stating that "MLS clubs were keen to lose the reputation that top stars only arrive to play in America for a final swansong in their careers". McManaman played for City for only two seasons and following Kevin Keegan's resignation in March 2005, never played another game for the club. Keegan's replacement, Stuart Pearce, released McManaman on a free transfer on 20 May.

=== Retirement ===
McManaman retired from his playing career after being released by Manchester City in 2005. He ended his career across all his three clubs with a total of 566 appearances, scoring 80 goals. In early 2006, McManaman nearly came out of retirement to sign for the Hong Kong Rangers, a club owned by an admirer of his football, Carson Yeung, but the deal fell through due to McManaman's recurrent injuries which scuppered his fitness test.

== International career ==
=== Summary ===
McManaman is sometimes described as an enigma at international level for England. Excluding Terry Venables and Kevin Keegan, every England manager decided to utilise McManaman's talents sparingly. McManaman was capped 37 times for England and scored three goals. England lost only three times in the games that he played; these included the UEFA Euro 1996 penalty shootout defeat to Germany at Wembley in 1996, and the opening day defeat against Portugal at UEFA Euro 2000. Over his 11 years as an England international, McManaman played in tournaments such as UEFA Euro 1996 and the 1998 FIFA World Cup. UEFA Euro 2000, held in the Netherlands and Belgium, was McManaman's last major tournament for England, despite pressure from the press, fans and teammates, including Zinedine Zidane, to include him in the final squad for the 2002 FIFA World Cup.

=== 1990–1993: England U21 ===
McManaman made history by becoming the first player without first-team experience to play for the England under-21 team, being handed a debut call-up by Lawrie McMenemy against Wales at Tranmere in October 1990, two months before he debuted for the Liverpool first-team. McMenemy commented that he had seen "more fat on a chip" referring to McManaman's skinny physique. In February 1993, McManaman captained the under-21 team for the first time against San Marino and scored the last goal in a 6–0 win.

=== 1994–1997: Senior breakthrough and UEFA Euro 1996 ===
Terry Venables gave McManaman his full debut on 16 November 1994 in an international friendly with Nigeria at Wembley, McManaman coming on as a replacement for Rob Lee. By 1995, McManaman was accused of struggling to repeat his fine club form with his country, drawing comparisons to his mentor at Liverpool, John Barnes. However, he managed to string together a series of match winning performances for his country at UEFA Euro 1996, earning praise from Pelé, who according to the BBC touted him as the tournament's best player and said he was the player he "was most impressed" by; before going on to say that he was "one of the best players in Europe" and could be the "best in the world" (at the time).

The tournament began with a game against Switzerland in which McManaman swapped wings interchangeably with Darren Anderton and created "all kinds of problems on the left". McManaman and Teddy Sheringham, and later Paul Gascoigne, were then substituted in order to save them for the next game when England were leading 1–0 with 15 minutes remaining. This decision led to an immediate outpouring of unhappiness and jeering from the crowd at Wembley. Following this, England switched to a defensive 4–5–1 formation which saw them concede a late penalty and end up drawing the game 1–1.

McManaman was noted by pundits for his "mesmerising dribbling skills" and willingness to take players on. Gary McAllister later claimed in the BBC's post-match analysis of England's next game against Scotland that it was Venables' change of England's tactics at half-time to switch to a five-man midfield and introduce Jamie Redknapp into the midfield that allowed McManaman the freedom to open up the Scottish defence. McAllister believed that this changed the game, with Redknapp and McManaman unlocking the openings which led to Gary Neville's cross for Alan Shearer's headed opener in the 2–0 win.

Despite having a quiet first half in England's next game against the Netherlands, McManaman was involved in all of England's first three goals against the opposition: firstly, he supplied the inside cut final pass for Ince who was subsequently brought down in the area for a penalty which Shearer scored from; secondly, his cross to Anderton was deflected for a corner kick from which Sheringham headed the second goal; and finally, his quick one-two with Gascoigne led to England's third and Shearer's second in the game which ended up in a 4–1 victory. This was believed to be a landmark result at the time.

Frequently man-marked in the quarter-final against Spain, McManaman burst back into the latter part of the semi-final against Germany and in the final moments of extra-time nearly assisted Darren Anderton in scoring a late winner. However, Anderton's shot from McManaman's cross hit the post and the ball bounced back into the hands of the goalkeeper. Together with teammates Gascoigne, Shearer and David Seaman, McManaman was listed in the official Team of the Tournament, as well as shortlisted behind eventual winner, Jürgen Klinsmann, for the Most Valuable Player award.

=== 1997–1999: Tactical Conundrums and 1998 FIFA World Cup ===
McManaman, however, failed to win over new England coach Glenn Hoddle despite being in excellent club form in the years Hoddle was in charge, raising questions about either his effort, his attitude, or his relationship with the manager, with some sections of the British press even lobbying Hoddle to pick McManaman. Roy Evans (McManaman's coach at the time) also voiced his opinion regarding his England situation to The Independent before the 1998 FIFA World Cup qualifiers, saying: "There is not a player like him in England. I think he's fantastic, he's certainly a great asset from our point of view...We don't pick the England team but I see him as the perfect linkman in the international team. But that's only our opinion. We believe he is top, top quality."

Hoddle stated in interviews that he wanted McManaman to take up that very licence to be the bridge between David Beckham and Paul Gascoigne, and often spoke highly of McManaman's ability, but said that McManaman's best position was "floating" dangerously and it was hard to fit him into a system to suit the team and so he often selected Paul Merson and the rising Beckham instead. When McManaman (and Robbie Fowler) opted out of Le Tournoi in 1997 to choose to undergo non-urgent medical operations ahead of international duty, it was noted that this reportedly lost them their team spots as Hoddle though angered at losing them, found a winning team in their absence, and this made it even harder for McManaman to regain his place later.

McManaman (and Fowler) were also reported at the time to have been marginalised by Hoddle for not embracing Hoddle's employment of a "faith healer" and mystic named Eileen Drewery, who had been brought in by Hoddle to do psychiatric, vague spiritual or psychological interactions with the players because Hoddle had said she helped him in his career in the past. McManaman and Fowler allegedly poked fun at Drewery by asking her "if she knew the winner of the 3.15 at Wincanton so they could put a bet on", while McManaman was reported as saying that 'Hoddle's training camps were "like joining the Moonies."' McManaman's England colleague, Gary Neville conceded Hoddle's methods were regarded as bizarre and included other devices such as 'heart touching', getting staff to walk around the pitch anti-clockwise to create 'positive energy' and the use of legal sporting injections, with McManaman and Fowler allegedly not the only ones who were unable to accept or fit in with Hoddle's training system, and McManaman accusing Hoddle of running things like a cult; favouring those players who were willing to acquiesce to him.

McManaman played a total of four full games out of six starts in his seven appearances under Hoddle, including only one appearance at the 1998 FIFA World Cup against Colombia, as a substitute for Paul Scholes. Despite only playing 17 minutes, the press described McManaman's performance: "In 17 minutes did enough to demonstrate that his dainty dribbling could yet be influential against miserly defences. Still gives ball away too much."

In Beckham's eponymous autobiography in 2013, he revealed that on the day after the defeat to Argentina in the 1998 World Cup, when he felt all alone and distraught back at the team hotel, it was McManaman (along with Terry Byrne and the England team's masseur, Steve Slattery), who stayed behind to accompany him and play snooker with him late into the night; in order to help take his mind off the fallout of that defeat (having been made the culprit by some sections of the media and fans for getting sent off during that match).

Before McManaman joined Madrid, Spanish media outlets like El País, eager to make sense of why Madrid were insisting on signing McManaman when he had not even featured much in the last World Cup, concluded that the only rationale to explain McManaman's non-selection by Hoddle must have been because McManaman was known as a free role-playing playmaker, and was "difficult to classify. He needs the point of freedom...not provided in the English team" and that he was therefore by implication, difficult to place into Hoddle's system. According to Ian Ridley of the Irish Independent Newspaper, "...it was significant that the best ball-carrier in the country, Steve McManaman, prospered under Venables but languished under Hoddle."

When interviewed by FourFourTwo, McManaman stated, "I think I probably least enjoyed my time when Glenn Hoddle was the manager. But I wouldn't say he was necessarily the worst. He had his ways of training and ways of acting and all managers have different ways of doing things; it's the same with club managers. Sometimes when you join up with England and you don't play as often as you did under a certain other manager—then you'll think it's terrible. I loved going to play with England. For instance, I did get to go to the World Cup even though I only played for 17 minutes. That kind of experience leaves an indelible mark on your mind. So I don't really think of it in terms of "worst"; but going to the World Cup and not playing much was a big thing for me, really, and that was under Glenn, of course." Hoddle also arranged for McManaman to meet a disabled fan (and thus fulfil his lifelong wish of meeting McManaman) while the fan was on the verge of death, in 1997, though the story only broke a year after Hoddle had been dismissed from the England job.

=== 1999–2001: Reinstatement and UEFA Euro 2000 ===
After Kevin Keegan was appointed as England manager, he quickly reinstated McManaman to the England starting lineup, further adding that he thought McManaman was one of the best midfielders in Europe. John Barnes spoke about McManaman in his autobiography in 1999 as "probably the greatest individual talent in English football and has to be presented the correct way", and Keegan gave several interviews in 1999 backing up that point; adding that he was finding out how best to utilise McManaman.

Keegan eventually decided on deploying McManaman on the left-wing on several occasions in 1999 and under Keegan, McManaman finally broke his international goal scoring duck when he scored twice on 4 September 1999 in the 6–0 Euro 2000 qualifier victory over Luxembourg, again, at Wembley. Keegan took McManaman's new career at Madrid as a basis to reinstate his confidence in him, and handed him a coveted free role ahead of UEFA Euro 2000, stating that "in the past we compromised him ... but [following McManaman's UEFA Champions League success], we said 'we'll fit in with you, you've earned that chance'. At the time, even former coach Glenn Hoddle chimed in with support for this decision, adding that though he feared teams would not give McManaman (and the team) the space he thrived on at the tournament, he believed that finding a way to deploy McManaman effectively in a special system was difficult "but it can be done."

McManaman's free role for England was shortlived as he played only once in Euro 2000, scoring the last of his three England goals in the opening game against Portugal, where he put England 2–0 ahead (with a volley off David Beckham's cross) after only 18 minutes, but got injured early in the second half whilst making a tackle on Rui Costa in midfield, forcing a tactical switch. England ended up losing the game 3–2, and McManaman would remain injured and miss the rest of the tournament as England exited at the group stage. McManaman never played another competitive match for Keegan again as he was ruled out with injury for Keegan's last couple of games before his shock resignation from the England job in October 2000.

=== Post 2001: Omission from squad ===
The last of McManaman's caps came in 2001 when new coach Sven-Göran Eriksson utilised him for England's first few games in the 2002 FIFA World Cup qualifiers — including a game back at Anfield against Finland (where McManaman admitted before the game that he had yet to achieve significant success with England and was hungry to prove himself) and where he would go on to set up David Beckham's winner.

By late 2001, however, after coming on as a substitute when England beat Germany 5–1 in the Olympiastadion, McManaman put in a display against Albania of "such apathy" according to The Guardian that the paradox of McManaman was stated as follows: "If McManaman is thought of at all in England now, it is as a man for whom exclusion beckons. Given his status at Real, England's World Cup squad should be comfortably within his grasp but McManaman, befitting someone who patrols the flanks, is drifting towards the periphery of Sven-Goran Eriksson's radar. The question is not whether McManaman, 30 a month ago, has the ability to force his way back into the centre of Eriksson's considerations but whether he has the will. In England's World Cup qualifier against Albania at St James' Park last September, four days after Munich, he made a fleeting appearance of such apparent apathy that even he was taken aback, never mind Eriksson." That performance saw McManaman banished from Eriksson's team, as that was his penultimate game; making just one substitute appearance after that in the critical qualifier against Greece in 2001.

McManaman stated in his biography that he was struggling at the time working out if Eriksson rated him, saying that although he could see reasons why the coach dropped him (Eriksson picked Emile Heskey ahead of McManaman to start the Greece game and only brought McManaman on when England were still 2–1 down with 15 minutes to go), he (McManaman) wondered: "[I didn't understand it]; if he didn't rate me, why would he bring me on against Greece [when we were losing]?" This prompted some media commentators such as Brian Reade to suggest that it was McManaman's attitude, mentality or pride that Eriksson did not like and was the reason for his drop.

Later that year, McManaman "chose not to play" in the game against Sweden by calling the FA to have himself dropped from the squad, before assistant coach at the time, Tord Grip said: "McManaman has never really played well for England". Following that, McManaman was not selected for another England squad.

By early 2002, Eriksson apparently left a message on McManaman's answering machine to inform him that he was not going to be in the final World Cup squad. Despite the pleas of McManaman's Real Madrid teammates Zinedine Zidane, Raúl and Fernando Hierro for McManaman's case, McManaman said he never heard from or met Eriksson again. Zidane went on to state England had made a mistake and described McManaman as one of the highest quality players he ever played with.

Support for McManaman also came before the 2002 FIFA World Cup in the British media, after Sky Sports published an article based on Opta statistics, revealing that despite a poor goalscoring record, McManaman had, in fact, an 88% dribbling completion rate (having embarked on a run every 17 minutes), and an 84% pass completion rate, all three of which were higher by over 15% than any English midfield Premiership player at the time. However, the same statistics also cast light on a different kind of dilemma for Eriksson after it was revealed that: "...For Real Madrid, he (McManaman) completed 83% of his passes and while that figure only fell to 82% in the Champions League it dropped to 73% when he was wearing an England shirt. For Madrid, he completed 85% of his dribbles and runs in the league and 83% in Europe but under Eriksson for England he only managed to keep the ball 63% of the time...the general belief for this drop in form when playing for England is simple. At Liverpool and Real Madrid, McManaman was in a side that liked to hold possession and move the ball about, pull teams apart and create spaces to move into. England tend to be more direct and less patient with their football and keep a more rigid formation. While at Anfield he was given pretty much a free-role and at Real Madrid the players all move about as they pass teams into submission, but England stick to a 4-4-2 formation and that does not suit him."

== Player profile ==
=== Style of play ===
A hard-working, versatile and technically gifted player, McManaman was usually deployed as a winger, or occasionally as a central midfielder. His preferred position, however, was that of a more offensive and creative attacking midfielder, an uncommon position in the Premier League throughout his career. McManaman was a quick, strong, creative, and energetic player with tremendous dribbling ability as well as accurate passing and crossing ability with either foot. This allowed him to create chances and provide assists for teammates. He was often criticised, however, for his inability to score many goals, although he would later improve upon this element of his game during the peak of his career. In October 2016, McManaman was nominated for the award of England's best dribbler of all time, an award eventually won by Stanley Matthews.

Though McManaman was occasionally criticised for scoring too few goals, he did make up for this with a formidable rate of assists for the likes of Robbie Fowler – with whom he was described as having an almost "telepathic" understanding – and, later Michael Owen, with Owen saying that "Liverpool at the time was built around McManaman" and was an average team whenever McManaman was not on form. Additionally, McManaman's role as the creative playmaking lynchpin in the side meant that scoring statistics alone were not often believed to measure his overall contributions. The few goals that McManaman did score often tended to be spectacular or memorable — most notably a stoppage-time solo goal against Celtic in the UEFA Cup, when McManaman scored after a 75-yard dribble. Other outstanding goals during his Liverpool career included goals against Aston Villa, Newcastle United and scoring the winner in a match against that season's eventual champions, Arsenal, with a stunning volley, after which he won a PFA Player of the Month award in December 1997.

In 2022, a pair of senior analysts at OPTA (Duncan Alexander and Graham Bell) dug up the statistical archives of the Premier League and said they were surprised (but not shocked) to discover that at the time McManaman left the Premier League in July 1999, McManaman had actually been one of the two most creative players in the league's entire history (alongside Matt Le Tissier) in terms of numbers for key passes and assists vis-a-vis appearances across the history of the league from 1992 till that point (posting even better numbers than third placed Ryan Giggs; which was where their surprise stemmed from as Giggs today is seen as a Premier League Hall of Famer whilst McManaman and Le Tissier are arguably lesser known).

=== Reception ===
==== Liverpool ====
McManaman is generally believed to be very popular in Liverpool. On 5 September 2006, he was named #22 in the official Liverpool website's "100 Players Who Shook The Kop" list. Both Rob Jones and Robbie Fowler gave two interviews in 2012–13 in which they stated that McManaman was the greatest player they ever played alongside, with Fowler also stating that he had "played with many, many great players", the best of whom was McManaman. In 2013, McManaman was named #20 in the official Liverpool website's second "100 Players Who Shook the Kop" list, rising by two positions.

==== "Spice Boys" ====
As the fame of McManaman and his teammates increased, tabloid newspaper stories of lad culture excesses emerged and this, fused with underachievement on the pitch, brought criticism in the media. Defeat to Alex Ferguson's Manchester United in three title races (from 1995–96 through 1996–97) including the 1996 FA Cup final, a game where the Liverpool team arrived to inspect the pitch wearing cream coloured Armani suits- intensified the criticism. McManaman and other teammates were reported to have cashed in on their newfound fame as stars of the nascent Premier League, to live a high life involving groupies, clubbing and other "high jinks". Modelling contracts and deals with fashion labels like Top Man, Hugo Boss and Armani culminated in their collective nickname, the "Spice Boys".

The situation was further aggravated by stories of McManaman and best friend Robbie Fowler's lifestyles off the pitch following an interview with the magazine Loaded, which depicted the duo as hedonists and 'scally' characters, as well as stories about McManaman and Fowler's lack of decorum and disruptive influence in the dressing room. McManaman responded by joining The Times to write a weekly column, becoming the first footballer of his generation to do so. McManaman's columns were known for articulating opinions on matters from a player's perspective, and in one particular column, discussed the issue of how the Bosman ruling impacted the future of the English game with "cut-price imports" that threatened local development, while also proposing the increasing of odds for smaller teams to beat big clubs by having the League Cup reduced to a single leg affair, thus enabling players to be better rested as well. By 1998, following the success of his well-regarded columns, he also began writing monthly pieces for Esquire magazine.

==== Legacy at Liverpool ====
When Mark Lawrenson and Jim Beglin named McManaman in their team of the 1990s, they said that most managers in the league used the same tactic of marking McManaman to stop Liverpool and whilst it was a tremendous compliment to McManaman, the opposition could stop Liverpool because the tactical system of 3–5–2 or 3–4–1–2 was too dependent on McManaman and would fail if McManaman was off form, or if the team was not complemented by a quality defence (players who could play both wingback and centre half to cope with onslaughts), or the presence of a steely defensive midfielder, which was what happened with the team of that time. Nevertheless, McManaman was voted in on the official Liverpool FC website as the club's midfielder of the 1990s, was named by Ruud Gullit as one of his top two players from the entire Premier League era, and despite Liverpool fans' disappointment over the nature of how McManaman conducted his departure, it is believed that many fans still regard McManaman, along with Fowler, as the two players who kept Liverpool in a good position through the 1990s.

In 2012, as part of the Premier League 20 Seasons Awards, McManaman was named on the shortlist for the award of best right midfielder, which was eventually won by Cristiano Ronaldo. In 2018, Sky Sports named McManaman and Fowler the third greatest goals-assists partnership in the Premier League era, just behind Drogba/Lampard, Sheringham/Anderton and just ahead of Pires/Henry. In 2020, Sky Sports placed McManaman at number 25 on a list of the "top 50 players to have never won a Premier League title", while FourFourTwo magazine listed McManaman at number 22 on a list of the Premier League's 25 best players of the 1990s. In June 2022, Liverpool's elite fan website, This is Anfield placed McManaman at number 4 of the top 10 players with the most assists in Liverpool's history; ranking only behind John Barnes, Steven Gerrard and Kenny Dalglish.

==== Real Madrid ====
McManaman remains popular in Madrid. He is listed as a club legend on the official Real Madrid website, which also describes him as a man who "in only four seasons, won the hearts of Madrid's followers" owing to the "mixture of his gentlemanly nature both on and off the pitch, combined with teamwork and quality". In Madrid, McManaman is also remembered as "the versatile Englishman".

McManaman was also twice voted as the Real Madrid supporters' favourite player during his tenure at the club. The Spanish media frequently covered his love of a Madrid lifestyle, his willingness to learn Spanish and immerse into Spanish culture, his home in La Moraleja, and noted a supposed androgynous resemblance to Hollywood actress Nicole Kidman, all of which bolstered his amiable image. According to El País, fans saluted him with their 'white handkerchiefs' (as a terrace favourite) after he scored a long-range high volley from a Roberto Carlos cross against Real Oviedo in 2001. McManaman still owns a house in Spain, which is situated in the bay of La Palma.

McManaman has spoken of his "adoration" for Real Madrid and is still in contact with all his former teammates owing to a WhatsApp group.

==== Under the Galácticos policy ====
While he was seen as an early Galáctico in his time at Real Madrid, McManaman increasingly saw his playing time reduced each year as the club further initiated their Galácticos policy, with new high-profile players like Luís Figo, David Beckham, Zinedine Zidane and Ronaldo arriving each year and often starting more matches than him. At the time, however, McManaman was known for his dogged determination to stay positive for the club's cause, even if it meant he had less playing time. In 2002, McManaman turned down a transfer to Inter Milan at the time when he was made available for exchange as part of Ronaldo's signing. It was widely reported in the Spanish media that McManaman's commitment to the team won the respect of his fellow professionals such as Zidane, Raúl, Guti, Iván Helguera and the two men often considered to be his two best friends at the club, Figo and Ronaldo, who backed him publicly on several occasions in press interviews.

Additionally, it is believed that McManaman also forced himself to reinvent his game and transform himself with a versatility that enabled him to play utility roles in the side, thus helping him shake off a nickname he was initially given by the Spanish press, El Cartero ("the postman"), which suggested that his delivery was unpredictable. It was widely regarded as a credit to McManaman that he managed to constantly reinvent himself to be effective and useful in a squad that was widely regarded at the time as the "best team in the world" under the Galácticos policy.

According to certain critics in the Spanish press, McManaman and several other teammates became "victims" as the Real Madrid's Galácticos policy was often said to be based more on marketing and revenue generation. This sometimes meant players were arguably picked not according to form, but instead owing to their money-making potential off the pitch. McManaman never spoke ill of the Galácticos policy's effects on him during his tenure, only critiquing the policy and ultimately describing it in his autobiography El Macca in 2004 as the "Disneyfication of Real Madrid" upon his departure from the club.

==== Legacy at Real Madrid ====
McManaman is also believed to have influenced other British players to join Real Madrid with players such as Michael Owen stating that they asked him for advice before signing for the club. McManaman later encouraged Welsh footballer Gareth Bale to sign for Madrid a decade later, and upon Bale's signing, he gave Bale advice on how to succeed at Madrid. Bale later became the first player to emulate McManaman when he ended up winning the Champions League with Madrid in his first season.

In a tribute to McManaman, four years after he left the club, ex-coach Vicente del Bosque told AS Marca, that McManaman and Geremi were the two most important players in his squad, because "together they kept the whole team united". Del Bosque added, "I was very happy with Macca. He was a caballero, a gentleman, a stupendous guy; he always had a smile, he never complained, he was great, a leader. He related to everyone very well; he united people. He had a bad time [towards the end] with achilles pain, but every day he trained with the same attitude. He was exemplary ... and a good footballer too, very good. A fantastic player in every sense." McManaman was also listed in Spanish-based British sports reporter Sid Lowe's Real Madrid Team of the Decade for the 2000s.

==== England ====
McManaman was once described as "England's forgotten man" but was also accused of being apathetic and having a laidback attitude and having a reputation for being a troublemaker, which began after an incident before Euro 96, where along with Teddy Sheringham and Paul Gascoigne, McManaman was photographed drinking in Hong Kong, and subsequently accused of causing thousands of pounds' worth of damage to a Cathay Pacific first-class flight cabin, although this was later reported to have not been caused by McManaman or Robbie Fowler as the whole England team took collective responsibility for Gascoigne's antics on the flight, while the party in Hong Kong was a team party.

McManaman's reputation was also not aided by the fact that he was also known for being a serial prankster with Fowler, which did nothing to help new coaches' negative opinions about him, with the Spice Boys' image also making it worse, though colleague Gareth Southgate did say McManaman's and Fowler's antics, though "silly", helped foster team spirit. In 2004, certain journalists even called for McManaman to be included in the Euro 2004 squad, arguing that McManaman's experience would have been worth his inclusion in the side alone, but to no avail as McManaman himself decided to retire shortly after.

In 2020, 90 Minutes named McManaman as one of their 10 most overlooked England players of all time.

== Post-playing career ==
=== Post-retirement football career ===
==== Managerial and directorial intentions ====
In January 2009, McManaman gave a press interview where he stated his intention to go into management. "I'm still thinking of getting back into the game and hopefully I will do my coaching badges at some point this year ... It is going to be hard, though. There seems to be far less jobs available for the younger guys. Paul Ince, Roy Keane, Tony Adams — it seems as if people have got it in for them. It's becoming a bit less attractive ... If I do get back in, I don't want to be a coach ... I want to be a manager, but that's easier said than done ... I want to be able to pick the team, make the decisions and everything that goes with it. That said, I can't do anything without my badges", he told the Liverpool Echo.

In October 2013, it was announced by then Liverpool manager Brendan Rodgers that McManaman would be taking up a coaching role with Liverpool at the academy to help nurture the club's future talents. McManaman would continue this role at the academy under Jürgen Klopp. McManaman was heavily involved with the cultivation of the talent Trent Alexander-Arnold, among others.

In 2024, McManaman graduated with his Diploma from the PFA Business School, having successfully undertaken the PFA Diploma in Sport Directorship programme.

==== Media career ====
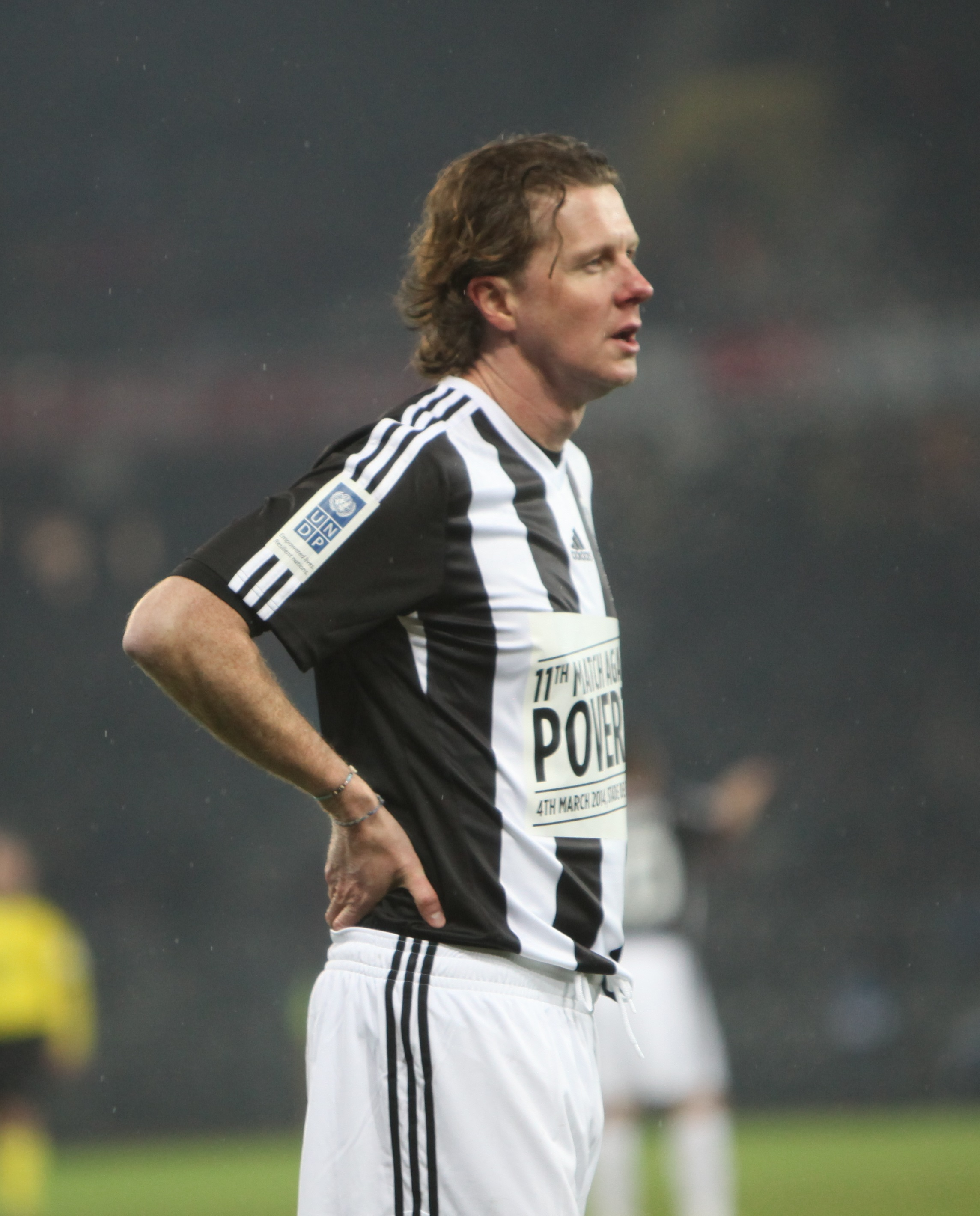
McManaman playing in a charity match in 2014

McManaman first got a taste for media work in 2005 after he became active as a freelance media commentator and pundit, providing analysis to ITV for the 2005 UEFA Champions League final, in which he provided the analysis as his old club Liverpool won the trophy. McManaman then went on to take up opportunities for Asia's largest football broadcasters, ESPN Star (now Fox Sports Asia), in Singapore in 2006, where he worked alongside commentator John Dykes and ex-players such as fellow ex-Liverpool star Steve McMahon.

By 2007, McManaman became a full-time media pundit, having joined Setanta Sports as a football analyst and, for the 2007–08 season, he was given his own television show — Macca's Monday Night — reflecting on life in the Barclays Premier League. He hosted the show and was joined by Neil Warnock, James Richardson, Emmanuel Petit, Tim Sherwood, and Les Ferdinand. The show was finally cancelled in favour of Football Matters, a live late-Monday-night discussion show hosted by Richardson and Rebecca Lowe. Renowned for his direct comments, in one of McManaman's broadcasts in February 2008, McManaman found himself criticised in the Liverpool press and by former Liverpool fans when his comments for Setanta after a Merseyside derby, on the ownership issue concerning debt involving Tom Hicks and George Gillett at Anfield went down poorly with the supporters.

Since July 2010, having joined commentator Ian Darke and former Germany coach Jürgen Klinsmann, as well as Dutch international Ruud Gullit, on the ESPN coverage team as a studio analyst for the 2010 FIFA World Cup, he then signed on with the network to be a color commentator for Major League Soccer and the MLS Cup 2010, the Premier League, the UEFA Euro 2012, the 2013 FIFA Confederations Cup, and 2014 World Cup, and UEFA Euro 2016, pairing with Darke for all of them.

In late November 2010 and in May 2011, McManaman was the halftime in-studio analyst alongside Gary Lineker and Trevor Francis for La Liga's El Clásico broadcast on Al Jazeera Sports +3. McManaman and Darke were the main ESPN commentary team for UEFA Euro 2012, while McManaman was also a guest on daily panel show, ESPN PressPass (now re-branded as ESPN FC), alongside Steve Nicol, Robbie Mustoe, Shaka Hislop, Robbie Earle and Gabriele Marcotti.

From the 2013–14 season, McManaman joined BT Sport as one of its lead co-commentators for its new Premier League coverage, In 2014, McManaman and Darke partnered each other for one last time as co-commentators exclusively for the USA's ESPN coverage of the 2014 FIFA World Cup, in which Darke and McManaman commentated on the match between Brazil and Germany; and got plaudits for their incredulous statements, reactions and colourful comments during the game.

From the 2014–15 season onward, McManaman then returned home to be permanently based in England and also could be regularly seen as a guest on BT Sport's Champions League coverage, and on shows like Premier League Tonight with Jake Humphrey. In 2016, McManaman served as a co-commentator for UEFA Euro 2016 on ESPN, alongside Darke for England games as well as a pundit in the studio. In 2018, McManaman returned to ESPNFC as a pundit for the first time since 2012, and on 29 June became the only pundit to correctly predict 12 out of the last 14 in the knockout stages of the 2018 FIFA World Cup including getting the semi-finals, final, and ultimate winner exactly correct. He worked UEFA Euro 2020 in the studio for ESPN mostly alongside Alessandro Del Piero, Craig Burley and Rece Davis. In 2021, McManaman returned to ESPN/ABC more prominently as their La Liga co-commentator, alongside Darke.

==== Film and charity appearances ====
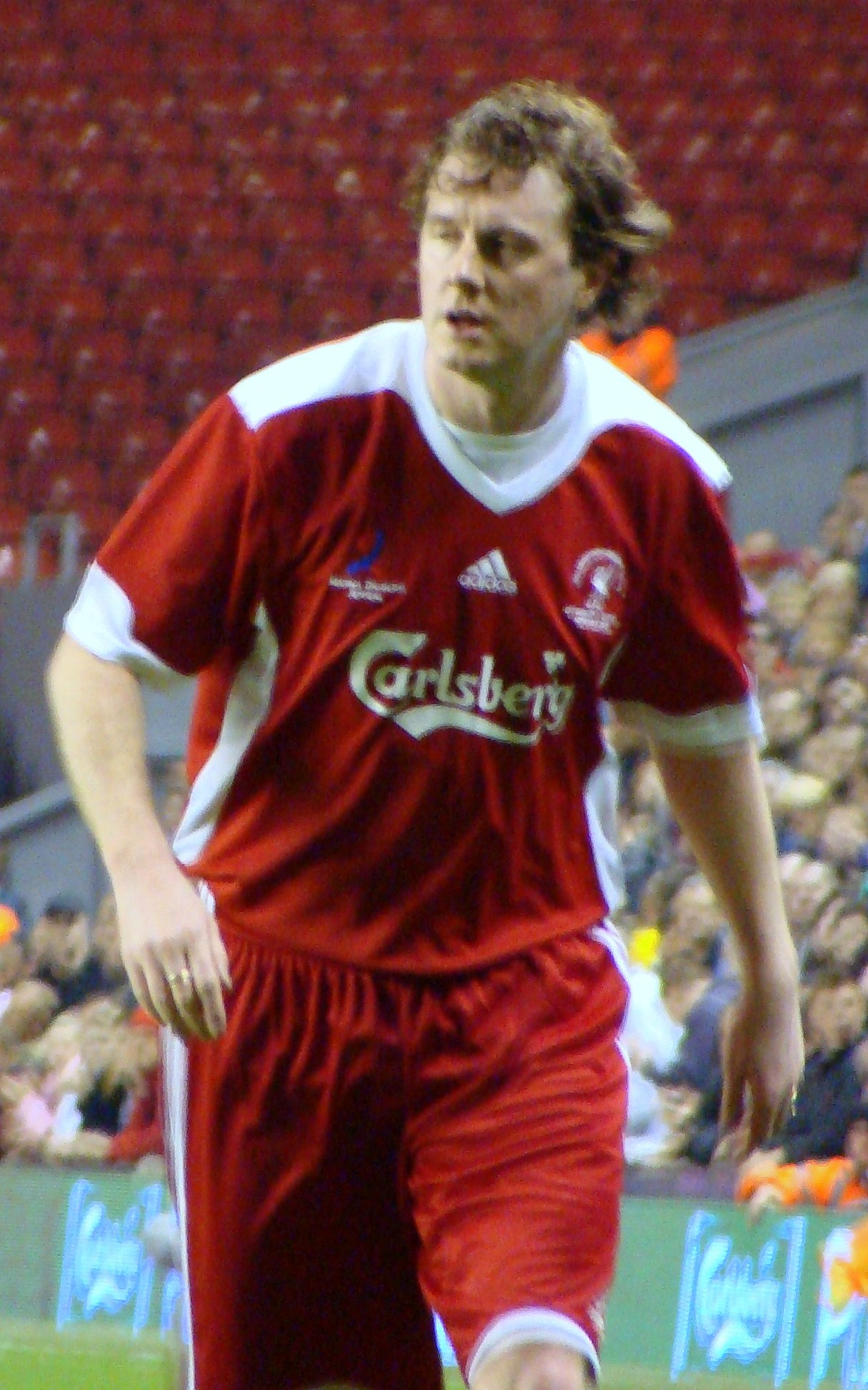
McManaman at a memorial match for Liverpool in 2009

In October 2006, McManaman played in a charity match for Liverpool Legends against Celtic Legends.

In late 2006, McManaman joined production for the film, Goal II: Living the Dream, the sequel to Goal! By the time of release in 2007, McManaman had also become an associate producer of the film, and appears in the film as one of the coaching staff for Kuno Becker's lead character. McManaman was also active in promoting the film with star Anna Friel at its premiere.

In June 2008, McManaman participated in Steve Nash and Claudio Reyna's Showdown in Chinatown, an 8-on-8 charity soccer game at Sara D. Roosevelt Park. Nash scored two goals in his team's 8–5 victory, which included McManaman scoring one goal and making five of the goals in a team including Thierry Henry, Robbie Fowler, Jason Kidd, Baron Davis, and Phoenix Suns teammates Raja Bell and Leandro Barbosa.

In December 2011, McManaman was also invited to be a part of the United Nations Development Programme football squad by former teammates Zinedine Zidane and Ronaldo (ambassadors of the UNDP), to take part in a series of friendly matches to raise funds known as Match Against Poverty.

Finally, in 2017, McManaman joined the Liverpool Masters team on their "Battle of the Masters Asia Tour" (along with the Arsenal Masters team), and played and scored his last goal for the Masters team in Singapore.

==== Ambassadorial Roles ====
In 2010, McManaman became an ambassador for UEFA alongside Christian Karembeu in its Champions League Trophy World Tour, as well as at the Madrid Festival leading up to the 2010 Champions League final at the Santiago Bernabéu Stadium. McManaman, has also been taking part in several "legends" squads for testimonial matches and fundraisers, most notably, at domestic level with the likes of ex-Liverpool players, but also for the European Association of Former Players (EFPA) along with a host of retired stars like Hristo Stoichkov, Enzo Scifo and Lothar Matthäus. In May 2010, McManaman played for the Real Madrid Veteranos against Milan's Glorie team for charity known as the Corazon Classic, in front of a crowd of 80,000 at the Santiago Bernabéu.

In 2011, McManaman joined several former star players including Diego Maradona and former teammates Figo and Robbie Fowler in a select World XI to play against Chechen President Ramzan Kadyrov and his select XI in a match to mark the opening of the new national stadium in the war torn nation's capital of Grozny. The match drew criticism from some commentators and human rights groups due to Kadyrov's alleged human rights abuses. McManaman commented "This is not a piece of propaganda for us ... We are not here politically. We are just here to play football."

In 2012, McManaman was officially declared as UEFA's sole ambassador for the 2013 UEFA Champions League final to be held at Wembley. In 2015, McManaman was nominated by former teammate Raúl as one of his three nominees to participate in the 'Shoot for Love Challenge" fundraiser.

In 2018, McManaman was officially named a La Liga ambassador. McManaman spent a month in 2018 travelling around Europe, the US and Asia, promoting the competition.

In 2019, McManaman joined La Liga's Managing Director Ivan Codina as representatives to Asia to be present for the inking of La Liga's partnership with Asian cryptocurrency exchange, GCOX, to build its partnership with businesses in Asia and the Middle East.

In 2019, McManaman was also named as being part of the UEFA Euro 2020 official 48-man all-star ambassador squad from 12 nations, alongside former teammates Figo, Michael Owen, Paul Gascoigne and Alan Shearer. Also in 2019, McManaman commenced his role as a FIFA ambassador, and began with a visit to Cambodia.

In 2024, McManaman was announced as part of Real Madrid's Legends team alongside former teammates Iker Casillas, Zidane, Figo and Roberto Carlos, for the Corazon Classic match, against FC Porto Legends.

=== Corporate work ===
==== Horse-racing and the Macca and Growler Partnership ====
Together with Robbie Fowler, McManaman has invested in several racehorses through a company named The Macca and Growler Partnership, their most prolific horse being Seebald —trained by Martin Pipe and raced by jockey Tony McCoy — winner of 2003 Queen Elizabeth the Queen Mother Celebration Chase. In 2013, McCoy named his horse for the Chepstow races, "El Macca" in reference to McManaman. "El Macca" was five years old as of 2018 and as of 2024 is still owned by J. P. McManus. "El Macca" was last foaled on 8 February 2024.

==== Dealings with Hong Kong ====
In July 2007, McManaman was named executive director of Carson Yeung's Hong Kong-listed company Grandtop International Holdings Ltd, which subsequently took a 29.9% stake in Premier League side Birmingham City. In August 2009, Yeung confirmed that once his proposed takeover of Birmingham City went through, a role at St Andrew's would be given to McManaman, although he did not specify what role that would be. By 2010, McManaman was appointed as a board director at Birmingham City, with fellow director Peter Pannu citing McManaman as being present when some critical board decisions were made—a claim which McManaman denied.

On 4 June 2012, it was announced that McManaman had resigned as an executive director of Birmingham International Holdings, the company that owned Birmingham City. On 19 September 2012, the Hong Kong Stock Exchange criticised McManaman "... for failing to use best endeavours to procure Birmingham City International Holdings' compliance with the Exchange Listing Rules". The exchange said the company failed to disclose a large deposit it had to make as it was preparing to buy the English football club Birmingham City in 2009. The exchange also said the purchase of the club should have been put to the company's shareholders for their approval, which it was not. By 2014, Yeung was convicted of money laundering and Birmingham International was alleged to have been running out of money, leading to its suspension. McManaman maintained throughout that 'he had agreed to be on the board of BIHL for a role which was "more of a PR exercise". He said he had no involvement in any financial dealings, and "stepped away" after June 2011 when Yeung was arrested in Hong Kong and charged with money laundering offences.'

In 2007–08, McManaman also got involved with corporate dealings in Hong Kong with companies like Sure Trace Inc, which was set up by another porn baron and stock market and IT entrepreneur, James MacKay, who transferred two-thirds of the company to him. The company made news for wrong reasons as Sure Trace had made several major contract announcements which had not become actual, revenue-generating contracts and was delisted by the US Securities and Exchange Commission (SEC). The company then set up True Product ID as a company to conduct technology joint ventures in China and the company was transferred to McManaman. To protect investors, the SEC suspended Sure Trace Security in August 2005, citing the accuracy of public information regarding its technology sales.

=== Autobiography ===
In 2004, McManaman released his autobiography, El Macca- uniquely co-written in collaboration with and from the point of view of The Telegraph journalist, Sarah Edworthy- a work which was described as a biography of "unusual quality" and shortlisted as one of the Sunday Times Books of the Year and William Hill Sports Book of the Year.

== Personal life ==
McManaman's grandfather was a bookmaker and his father David (in the printing and publishing business, and who played football for Pwllheli in Wales) described the family as having "horseracing in their blood". From November 2019, McManaman began writing an exclusive bi-monthly op-ed column for British Horse Racing website, Horseracing.net.

McManaman married his longtime girlfriend (whom he met in the early 90s), Victoria Edwards, a barrister and law lecturer (who taught at the Complutense University of Madrid during her time in Madrid with McManaman), on 6 June 2002, in Mallorca's Palma Cathedral. The family divides its time between homes in Bay of Palma, London and Cheshire.

McManaman has also spoken about his Roman Catholic faith and upbringing, and how Real Madrid sought out the blessing of Pope John Paul II in 2002, saying: "I am a Catholic and what with all the Spanish, Portuguese and Brazilians, we are predominantly a Catholic team..."

== Career statistics ==
=== Club ===
Appearances and goals by club, season and competition
Club	Season	League			National cup (Note: Includes Copa del Rey, FA Cup)		League cup (Note: Includes Football League Cup)		Continental		Other		Total	
Club	Season	Division	Apps	Goals	Apps	Goals	Apps	Goals	Apps	Goals	Apps	Goals	Apps	Goals
Liverpool	1990–91	First Division	2	0	1	0	0	0	0	0	0	0	3	0
Liverpool	1991–92	First Division	30	5	8	3	5	3	8 (Note: Appearances in UEFA Cup)	0	—		51	11
Liverpool	1992–93	Premier League	31	4	1	0	5	2	3 (Note: Appearances in UEFA Cup Winners' Cup)	1	—		40	7
Liverpool	1993–94	Premier League	30	2	2	0	2	0	—		—		34	2
Liverpool	1994–95	Premier League	40	7	7	0	8	2	—		—		55	9
Liverpool	1995–96	Premier League	38	6	7	2	4	1	4	1	—		53	10
Liverpool	1996–97	Premier League	37	7	2	0	4	2	8	1	—		51	10
Liverpool	1997–98	Premier League	36	11	1	0	5	0	4	1	—		46	12
Liverpool	1998–99	Premier League	28	4	0	0	0	0	3	1	—		31	5
Liverpool	Total		272	46	29	5	33	10	30	5	0	0	364	66
Real Madrid	1999–2000	La Liga	28	3	5	0	—		13 (Note: Appearances in UEFA Champions League)	1	4 (Note: Appearances in FIFA Club World Championship)	0	50	4
Real Madrid	2000–01	La Liga	28	2	0	0	—		11	0	1 (Note: Appearance in Intercontinental Cup)	0	40	2
Real Madrid	2001–02	La Liga	23	2	4	0	—		13	2	1 (Note: Appearance in Supercopa de España)	0	41	4
Real Madrid	2002–03	La Liga	15	1	6	1	—		6	2	0	0	27	4
Real Madrid	Total		94	8	15	1	—		43	5	6	0	158	14
Manchester City	2003–04	Premier League	22	0	3	0	1	0	4	0	—		30	0
Manchester City	2004–05	Premier League	13	0	1	0	0	0	—		—		14	0
Manchester City	Total		35	0	4	0	1	0	4	0	—		44	0
Career total			401	54	48	6	34	10	77	10	6	0	566	80

=== International ===
Appearances and goals by national team and year
National team	Year	Apps	Goals
England	1994	1	0
England	1995	6	0
England	1996	9	0
England	1997	3	0
England	1998	3	0
England	1999	4	2
England	2000	5	1
England	2001	6	0
Total		37	3

Scores and results list England's goal tally first, score column indicates score after each McManaman goal

List of international goals scored by Steve McManaman
No.	Date	Venue	Cap	Opponent	Score	Result	Competition	Ref.
1	4 September 1999	Wembley Stadium, London, England	25	Luxembourg	2–0	6–0	UEFA Euro 2000 qualifying	
2	4 September 1999	Wembley Stadium, London, England	25	Luxembourg	5–0	6–0	UEFA Euro 2000 qualifying	
3	12 June 2000	Philips Stadion, Eindhoven, Netherlands	29	Portugal	2–0	2–3	UEFA Euro 2000	

== Honours ==
Liverpool

- FA Cup: 1991–92; runner-up: 1995–96
- Football League Cup: 1994–95

Real Madrid

- La Liga: 2000–01, 2002–03
- Supercopa de España: 2001
- UEFA Champions League: 1999–2000, 2001–02
- UEFA Super Cup: 2002

Individual

- Alan Hardaker Trophy: 1995
- PFA Team of the Year: 1996–97 Premier League
- UEFA European Championship Team of the Tournament: 1996
- Premier League Player of the Month: December 1997

== See also ==
- List of Liverpool F.C. players
- List of foreign La Liga players
