= Rob Jones (footballer, born 1971) =

English footballer

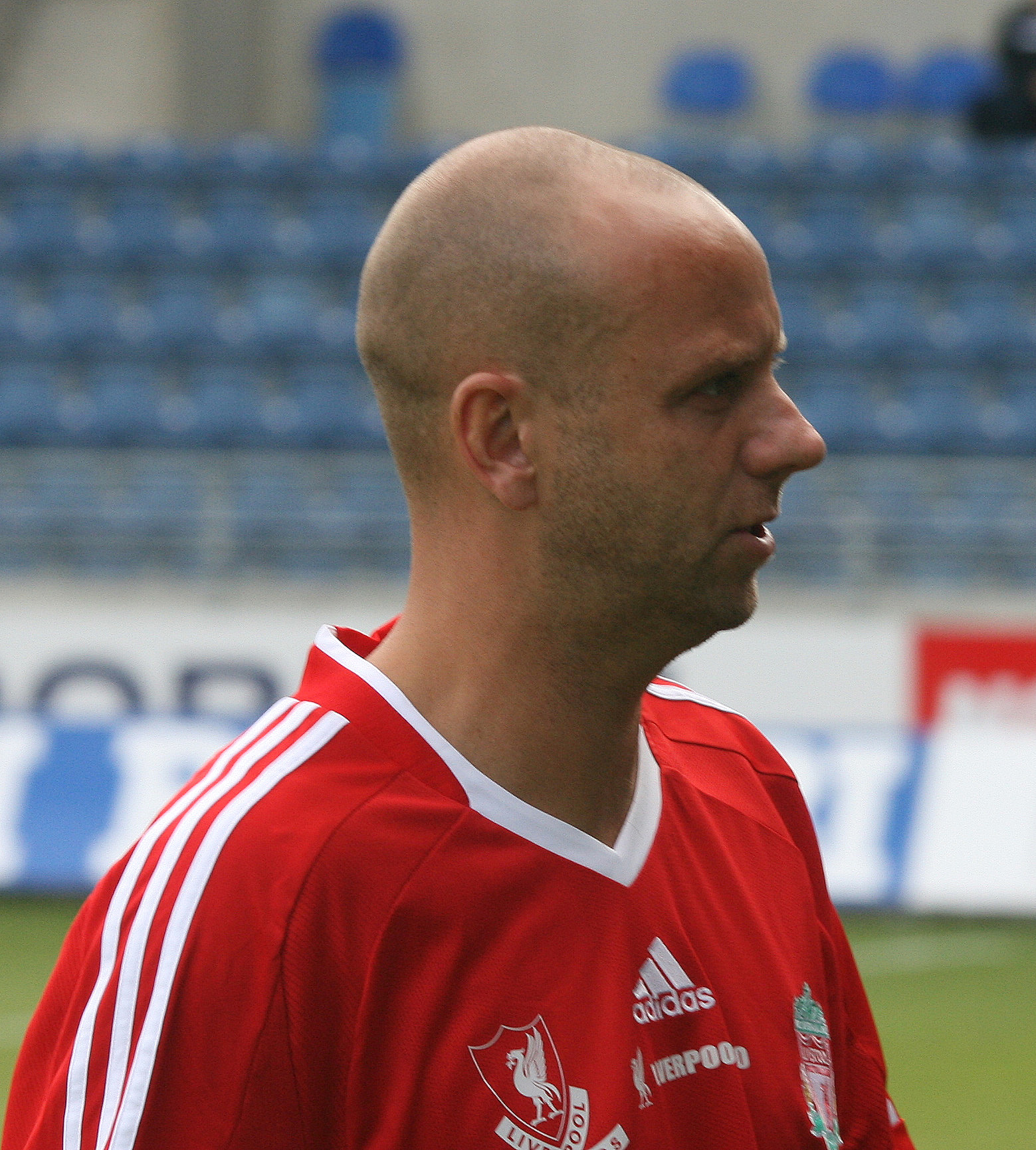
- Jones in 2008

Personal information
- Full name: Robert Marc Jones
- Date of birth: 5 November 1971 (age 54)
- Place of birth: Wrexham, Wales
- Height: 5 ft 8 in (1.73 m)
- Position: Right-back

Senior career*
Years	Team	Apps	(Gls)
1988–1991	Crewe Alexandra	75	(2)
1991–1999	Liverpool	185	(0)
1999	West Ham United	0	(0)
Total		260	(2)

International career
1993	England U21	2	(0)
1992–1995	England	8	(0)
- * Club domestic league appearances and goals

Robert Marc Jones (born 5 November 1971) is a professional football coach and former player Born in Wales, he represented England at international level.

As a player he was a defender from 1988 to 1999. After starting his career with Crewe Alexandra, he went on to make a name for himself with Liverpool where he won both the FA Cup and League Cup before finishing his career with a brief spell with West Ham United. He was capped eight times by England.

In 2013 he turned to coaching and was part of the Liverpool Academy coaching staff for several seasons.

== Early life ==
Jones, who grew up in Ellesmere Port, Cheshire, is the grandson of former Liverpool player Bill Jones.

== Club career ==
=== Crewe Alexandra ===
Jones began his career with Crewe Alexandra, signing professional forms at the age of 17 on 20 December 1988 when Crewe were in Division Four. The right-back settled quickly, quietly going about his defensive duties until being spotted during the 1991–92 season, accidentally, by Liverpool manager Graeme Souness who was at Gresty Road looking at a different player. Souness put in an offer of £300,000 which was accepted, and on 4 October 1991, a month before his 20th birthday, he became a Liverpool player.

=== Liverpool ===
His debut for the Reds came on 6 October 1991, just 48 hours after he had signed on at Anfield, with a game at Old Trafford, where he excelled against United winger Ryan Giggs and was named Man Of The Match in a goalless league draw. By the end of the season, Jones had won over the coach, become a regular in the starting line-up, had gained his first international cap, as well as helped the Reds to the final of the FA Cup at Wembley – a final that saw Liverpool beat Sunderland 2–0. He was also named in the 1991/92 PFA Team of the Year. However, he was ruled out of England's Euro 92 squad due to shin splints.

Over the next four seasons he was a regular member of the Liverpool starting line-up and in the sides that beat Bolton Wanderers 2–1 in the 1995 Football League Cup final and lost 1–0 to Man United in the 1996 FA Cup final. He was once more named in the PFA Team of the Year (1994/95).

When Liverpool signed midfielder Jason McAteer, who arrived in 1995, Roy Evans converted McAteer to right-back and employed Jones on the left-side in a wingback role as Liverpool changed from their normal 4–4–2 to an attack-minded 5–3–2 formation.

After the 1996 FA Cup final, Jones was advised to take a six-month break from football due to back problems. He returned to action, but the next two seasons were plagued by injuries, and in April 1998 he played what was to be his last game for Liverpool against Chelsea. An injury in his left knee could not be fixed, despite three operations, and at the end of the 1998–99 season, in which he had not played a game, he was released on a free transfer by new coach that year, Gérard Houllier, who was ushering in a new era at the club to eliminate the club's Spice Boys public image and stereotype.

=== West Ham United ===
Jones joined West Ham United, on non-contract terms, on 17 July 1999. He was named in the side that began the Intertoto Cup third round second leg tie against FC Jokerit, but was substituted after the first half as a result of aggravating his knee injury. This proved to be his last senior appearance, as he retired in August 1999.

== International career ==
At international level Jones was eligible to play for Wales, as he was born in Wrexham, but it was Graham Taylor who selected him and gave him his international debut for England in the 2–0 win over France at Wembley on 19 February 1992 – just four months after he had made the move from Fourth Division football to the First Division. Injury forced Jones to miss the UEFA Euro 1992 where he would have been the first choice right-back, but he went on to win eight international caps over the next few years.

== Style of play ==
Jones played 243 times for the Reds, earned several accolades and man of the match awards, although he famously never scored a goal for Liverpool. Teammate Steve McManaman described him to FourFourTwo magazine as the best defender he ever played with, naming him in his all time perfect XI alongside the likes of Zinedine Zidane, Luís Figo, and Roberto Carlos. Younger teammate Jamie Carragher also once said of Jones: "I played with Rob Jones a few times and he was a bit unfortunate with injuries and his best form was probably before I got into the team, when he was as good as probably anything in Europe at the time ... He was playing out of his skin and I think if he'd have stayed fit he probably would have gone on to win 70 or 80 caps for England instead of Gary Neville."

After failing to get over a knee injury that had severely affected him since late 1996, Jones announced his retirement on 28 August 1999, aged just 27.

== Coaching career ==
In October 2013 it was announced that Jones would be taking up a coaching role with Liverpool F.C. Academy, where his eldest son Declan is a trainee.

== Personal life ==
Jones lives in Warrington, with his wife Sue and their three children.

In 2012, he released his autobiography, titled Robbed.

Since his retirement, Jones and his wife have built-up Kids Academy, a franchise-based business of children's nurseries across the UK, but now called Evolution Childcare which also now extends into the United Arab Emirates.

== Honours ==
Crewe Alexandra

- Football League Fourth Division promotion: 1988–89

Liverpool

- FA Cup: 1991–92; runner-up: 1995–96
- Football League Cup: 1994–95

Individual

- PFA Team of the Year: 1991–92 First Division, 1994–95 Premier League

== See also ==
- List of England international footballers born outside England
