= Spice Boys (footballers) =

Group of Liverpool F.C. footballers in the 1990s

The Spice Boys was a media pejorative used to describe a group of high-profile Liverpool F.C. footballers in the mid-late 1990s, typically Jamie Redknapp, David James, Neil Ruddock, Steve McManaman, Robbie Fowler and Jason McAteer, but occasionally teammates such as Stan Collymore and Paul Ince. The name was a play on the Spice Girls.

== Term ==
The term 'Spice Boys' was coined by the Daily Mirror following (unfounded) tabloid rumours that Fowler was dating Spice Girl Baby Spice (Emma Bunton).

In the late 1990s, the influx of television and marketing revenue from the newly revamped and globally marketed FA Premier League saw footballers' wages soar. Photogenic players such as Jamie Redknapp and Welshman Ryan Giggs emerged as merchandising and mass-marketed 'poster boys' of the British game, with many players landing high-profile product endorsement contracts, such as Jason McAteer's with Head & Shoulders, while David James was signed up as an Armani underwear model in 1997. With the fame of Premier League footballers reaching unprecedented levels, criticism of the perceived underachievement of the Liverpool squad soon followed. The Daily Telegraph later described the 'Spice Boys' as a "Group of high-spirited, fun-loving young players who were a central feature of Liverpool's talented and entertaining, but perpetually under-achieving, squad of the Nineties. At least, that's the generous description. Others saw them as just an irresponsible bunch who were a bad influence in the dressing-room and should not be given house room."

== Incidents ==
Several incidents around the behaviour of the so-called Spice Boys generated major media attention, notably the squad's decision to wear matching cream Armani suits to the 1996 FA Cup Final – a game they went on to lose to key rivals Manchester United. Robbie Fowler told the Daily Mirror in 2008 that "People still remind me about the white suits all the time. It's one of those things – if we had won the game nobody would have mentioned it but we lost and it has become infamous."

McManaman and Fowler were also associated with the controversial "dentist's chair" story prior to Euro 1996. Rumours of a controversial 1998 Christmas party also filled the press. "Win, draw or lose, first to the bar for booze," was the dressing-room mantra, reportedly according to Neil Ruddock. Certain members of the Liverpool squad would sometimes be seen after matches flying down to London to get to the capital's nightclubs, such as Chinawhite, Ten Rooms or the Emporium, by 9pm. Players were romantically linked with known figures, such as Phil Babb dating the glamour model Jo Guest. Ruddock was quoted as saying "We were the first players to get big money, Porsches and Ferraris and get page three birds into bed." Ruddock shared an anecdote on the Sky Sports television show Soccer AM that Liverpool players would play a game during their fixtures where they would pass a pound coin between them in-match, and whoever was left holding it at the final whistle would have to pay for the first round of drinks after the game.

The players were also linked to music industry figures, with Robbie Williams joining the squad on the team bus before and after a Premier League fixture against Aston Villa in 1995. Jamie Redknapp, Jason McAteer and Phil Babb appeared in the music video One Kiss from Heaven by the pop singer Louise in November 1996.

=== Decline of use ===
Following the departure of Liverpool manager Roy Evans in 1998, with his co-manager Gérard Houllier taking full charge, the majority of the Spice Boy players were slowly transferred out of the squad or put under greater pressure to perform. The term gradually declined in media use, although was briefly revived when, in 2004, James, Fowler and McManaman were reunited at Manchester City, under Kevin Keegan.

== See also ==
- Crazy Gang of Wimbledon F.C.
- Fergie's Fledglings of Manchester United F.C.
