= 1996 FA Cup final =

English association football match

1996 FA Cup Final
- Event: 1995–96 FA Cup
Liverpool	Manchester United
0	1
- Date: 11 May 1996
- Venue: Wembley Stadium, London
- Man of the Match: Roy Keane (Manchester United)
- Referee: Dermot Gallagher (Oxfordshire)
- Attendance: 79,007

The 1996 FA Cup final was the 51st to be held at Wembley Stadium after the Second World War and was held between two of the biggest rivals in English football, Manchester United and Liverpool.

== Build-up ==
A few days before the final, Manchester United had secured their third league title in four years (1992–93, 1993–94 and 1995–96, coming second in 1994–95). The final was also their third in three seasons, having beaten Chelsea 4–0 in 1994 and lost 1–0 to Everton in 1995.

Liverpool, on the other hand, were going through a barren spell in terms of trophies, having not won the league title since 1989–90 or an FA Cup since 1992, although they had tasted success in the League Cup in 1995.

Liverpool and Manchester United were the two top scoring sides in the FA Premier League in this season, and entered the game as the most attacking sides in English football, with Liverpool winning their last meeting 2–0 at Anfield, and Manchester United equalising at Old Trafford to get a 2–2 draw in the reverse fixture, with Robbie Fowler scoring all four of Liverpool's goals against Manchester United in both meetings.

Both clubs released cup final songs, as was common at the time: Pass & Move (It's the Liverpool Groove) (which reached number 4 in the UK Singles Chart) and Move Move Move (The Red Tribe) (which reached number 6).

== Match summary ==
The match, despite the rivalry between the two teams, was a fairly unmemorable game, rarely sparking into life, with playmakers Eric Cantona and Steve McManaman, marked and closed out by Jamie Redknapp and John Barnes and Roy Keane and Nicky Butt respectively. Keane went on to stop virtually every attack the Liverpool midfield threw at Manchester United, and covering as commentator Peter Brackley described, "every blade of grass", to win the man of the match award.

The game started with a frenetic pace and Manchester United started with several positive chances before Liverpool came back into the game, but chances at either end were limited. Neither goalkeeper, Peter Schmeichel for Manchester United and David James for Liverpool, was seriously tested throughout the majority of the game. However, with just five minutes remaining on the clock, David James tried to punch a corner clear. The ball landed just outside the penalty area, at the feet of Manchester United captain Eric Cantona, who had scored in his comeback game after a seven-month suspension at Old Trafford against Liverpool earlier that season in a game that ended 2–2. Cantona hit his shot goalwards, through the crowded penalty area and the ball nestled in the back of the goal, winning the game for Manchester United. Cantona had been marked out of the game, but reflecting his form all season, managed another match-winning moment.

== Match details ==
11 May 1996
15:00 BST

Liverpool	0–1	Manchester United
	Report	Cantona 85'

Wembley Stadium, London
Attendance: 79,007
Referee: Dermot Gallagher (Oxfordshire)

Liverpool	Manchester United

GK	1	(England) David James
CB	12	(England) John Scales
CB	5	(England) Mark Wright
CB	6	(Republic of Ireland) Phil Babb	(yellow card) 60'
RWB	4	(Republic of Ireland) Jason McAteer
LWB	2	(England) Rob Jones		(substituted off) 86'
CM	15	(England) Jamie Redknapp	(yellow card) 40'
CM	10	(England) John Barnes (c)
AM	17	(England) Steve McManaman
CF	23	(England) Robbie Fowler
CF	8	(England) Stan Collymore		(substituted off) 74'
Substitutes:
GK	26	(England) Tony Warner
MF	16	(England) Michael Thomas		(substituted on) 86'
FW	9	(Wales) Ian Rush		(substituted on) 74'
Manager:
(England) Roy Evans

GK	1	(Denmark) Peter Schmeichel
RB	3	(Republic of Ireland) Denis Irwin
CB	6	(England) Gary Pallister
CB	12	(England) David May
LB	23	(England) Phil Neville	(yellow card) 69'
RM	24	(England) David Beckham		(substituted off) 90'
CM	16	(Republic of Ireland) Roy Keane
CM	19	(England) Nicky Butt
LM	11	(Wales) Ryan Giggs
SS	7	(France) Eric Cantona (c)
CF	17	(England) Andy Cole		(substituted off) 64'
Substitutes:
DF	20	(England) Gary Neville		(substituted on) 90'
MF	5	(England) Lee Sharpe
FW	22	(England) Paul Scholes		(substituted on) 64'
Manager:
(Scotland) Alex Ferguson

Match officials

- Assistant referees:
  - Anthony Bates (Staffordshire)
  - Peter Walton (Northamptonshire)
- Fourth official: Paul Durkin (Dorset)

Match rules

- 90 minutes
- 30 minutes of extra time if necessary
- Replay required if scores still level, to be played at 19:30 on 16 May 1996
- Three named substitutes
- Maximum of two substitutions

== Post-match ==
The win was Manchester United's third FA Cup win under Alex Ferguson, having also won in 1990 and 1994. They became the first club to win the competition nine times, and also became the first club to win the league championship and FA Cup double twice.

After the match, the Manchester United team was presented with the FA Cup trophy by The Duchess of Kent, wife of the President of The Football Association, Prince Edward. As the Manchester United players climbed the steps to the Royal Box to receive their medals, captain Eric Cantona was spat at by a spectator wearing a Liverpool shirt, while manager Alex Ferguson evaded a punch thrown by another.

For Liverpool, the match was the final appearance of goalscoring legend Ian Rush, who had scored 346 goals for the club since joining them in 1980 (sandwiched by a one-season spell at Juventus in the late 1980s) and left at the end of the season to sign for Leeds United. Neil Ruddock was left out of the Liverpool squad despite having played in both the quarter and semi-final, as well as in each of the last six league matches of the season. Manchester United's two longest serving players, Steve Bruce and Brian McClair, were dropped in favour of younger players for the final. Bruce never played for Manchester United again, as he was transferred to Birmingham City 11 days later, while McClair remained at the club for a further two seasons. The only Manchester United player whose involvement with the club ended with this game was unused substitute Lee Sharpe, who joined Rush at Leeds United just before the 1996–97 season began, after eight years at Old Trafford.

The match gained notoriety for non-football reasons, having been picked up by the British tabloids for its pre-match formalities because the Liverpool team turned up in cream-coloured Emporio Armani suits, outlandish striped ties, and white Gucci shoes, the outfit reportedly being picked by goalkeeper David James who had recently signed on to model that fashion label. Manchester United players, by contrast, wore traditional navy suits with a full button vest, black and white striped tie, and red carnation boutonnière. One commentator suggested that if Liverpool "won the cup, it would have been legendary, reminiscent of Italian flamboyance and audacity - the likes of which hadn’t been seen in English football before."
