= 1994–95 Liverpool F.C. season =

English football club season

Liverpool F.C.
1994–95 season
- Chairman: David Moores
- Manager: Roy Evans
- Stadium: Anfield
- FA Premier League: 4th
- FA Cup: Sixth round
- Coca Cola Cup: Winners
- Top goalscorer: League: Robbie Fowler (25); All: Robbie Fowler (31)
- Average home league attendance: 34,743
Home colours	Away colours	Third colours

The 1994–95 Liverpool F.C. season was the 103rd season in the club's existence, and their 33rd consecutive year in the top-flight. It was also the club's first full season under the management of Roy Evans, who had succeeded Graeme Souness halfway through 1993–94.

The season saw Liverpool win the League Cup for a record fifth time, beating Bolton Wanderers 2–1 in the final at Wembley with two goals from Steve McManaman. They improved on last season's eighth-place finish to reach fourth place in the final table, their best final position in four years, although they never really looked like serious title contenders.

Early in the season, Evans bolstered his defence by signing John Scales from Wimbledon and Phil Babb from Coventry City. In attack, Robbie Fowler was top scorer with 25 goals in the league and 31 in all competitions, while the ageing Ian Rush continued to thrive with 12 in the league and 19 in all competitions.

Heading out of the Anfield exit door early in the season was midfielder Don Hutchison to West Ham United, while January saw exit of defender Steve Nicol to Notts County after 13 years at Anfield. The club suffered a tragedy on 2 January 1995 when 19-year-old midfielder Ian Frodsham, who was on a professional contract but had yet to play a first team game, died of cancer of the spine.

== Players ==
=== First-team squad ===
Note: Flags indicate national team as defined under FIFA eligibility rules; some limited exceptions apply. Players may hold more than one non-FIFA nationality.

No.	Pos.	Nation	Player
1	GK	ENG	David James
2	DF	ENG	Rob Jones
5	DF	ENG	Mark Wright
6	DF	IRL	Phil Babb (Note: Babb was born in Lambeth, England, but also qualified to represent the Republic of Ireland internationally and made his international debut for the Republic of Ireland in 1994.)
7	MF	ENG	Nigel Clough
8	MF	ENG	Paul Stewart
9	FW	WAL	Ian Rush (captain)
10	MF	ENG	John Barnes
11	MF	ENG	Mark Walters
12	DF	ENG	John Scales
13	GK	DEN	Michael Stensgaard
14	MF	DEN	Jan Mølby
15	MF	ENG	Jamie Redknapp

No.	Pos.	Nation	Player
16	MF	ENG	Michael Thomas
17	MF	ENG	Steve McManaman
18	DF	ENG	Phil Charnock
19	MF	IRL	Mark Kennedy
20	DF	NOR	Stig Inge Bjørnebye
21	DF	ENG	Dominic Matteo (Note: Matteo was born in Dumfries, Scotland, but was raised in England from the age of four and represented them at U-21 and B level before making his international debut for Scotland in November 2000.)
22	DF	ENG	Steve Harkness
23	FW	ENG	Robbie Fowler
24	FW	WAL	Lee Jones
25	DF	ENG	Neil Ruddock
26	GK	ENG	Tony Warner (Note: Warner was born in Liverpool, England, but also qualified to represent Trinidad and Tobago internationally and would make his international debut for Trinidad and Tobago in February 2006.)
28	GK	ENG	Alec Chamberlain (on loan from Sunderland)

=== Left club during season ===
Note: Flags indicate national team as defined under FIFA eligibility rules; some limited exceptions apply. Players may hold more than one non-FIFA nationality.

No.	Pos.	Nation	Player
4	DF	SCO	Steve Nicol
6	MF	SCO	Don Hutchison (Note: Hutchison was born in Gateshead, England, but also qualified to represent Scotland internationally through his father and represented them at B level in 1994 before making his international debut for Scotland in March 1999.)

No.	Pos.	Nation	Player
27	GK	ENG	Mark Prudhoe (on loan from Stoke City)

=== Reserves and academy ===
Note: Flags indicate national team as defined under FIFA eligibility rules; some limited exceptions apply. Players may hold more than one non-FIFA nationality.

No. / Pos. / Nation / Player; — / DF / ENG / Jamie Carragher	No. / Pos. / Nation / Player; — / DF / ENG / Michael Howard

== Transfers ==
=== In ===
#	Pos	Player	From	Fee	Date
13	GK	(Denmark) Michael Stensgaard	(Denmark) Hvidovre IF	£400,000	1 June 1994
6	DF	(Republic of Ireland) Phil Babb	(England) Coventry City	£3,600,000	1 September 1994
12	DF	(England) John Scales	(England) Wimbledon	£3,500,000	2 September 1994
19	MF	(Republic of Ireland) Mark Kennedy	(England) Millwall	£1,500,000	21 March 1995

=== Out ===
#	Pos	Player	To	Fee	Date
3	DF	(England) Julian Dicks	(England) West Ham United	£300,000	20 May 1994
19	DF	(Denmark) Torben Piechnik	(Denmark) AGF	Free	1 June 1994
1	GK	(Zimbabwe) Bruce Grobbelaar (Note: Grobbelaar was born in Durban, South Africa, but was raised in Rhodesia (later named Zimbabwe) from the age of two months and made his international debut for Rhodesia in 1977 and for Zimbabwe in 1980.)	(England) Southampton	Free	11 August 1994
6	MF	(Scotland) Don Hutchison	(England) West Ham United	£1,500,000	30 August 1994
12	MF	(Republic of Ireland) Ronnie Whelan	(England) Southend United	Free	9 September 1994
4	DF	(Scotland) Steve Nicol	(England) Notts County	Free	20 January 1995

== Competitions ==
=== FA Premier League ===
==== League table ====
Pos	Team	Pld	W	D	L	GF	GA	GD	Pts	Qualification or relegation
2	Manchester United	42	26	10	6	77	28	+49	88	Qualification for the UEFA Cup first round (Note: Leeds United were rewarded entry to the UEFA Cup through UEFA Fair Play ranking.)
3	Nottingham Forest	42	22	11	9	72	43	+29	77	Qualification for the UEFA Cup first round
4	Liverpool	42	21	11	10	65	37	+28	74	Qualification for the UEFA Cup first round
5	Leeds United	42	20	13	9	59	38	+21	73	Qualification for the UEFA Cup first round
6	Newcastle United	42	20	12	10	67	47	+20	72	

Source: Premier League
Rules for classification: 1) points; 2) goal difference; 3) number of goals scored.

==== Matches ====
20 August 1994 1	Crystal Palace	1–6	Liverpool	London
15:00	Armstrong 49'	Report	Mølby 12' (pen.); McManaman 14', 70'; Fowler 45'; Rush 60', 73'	Stadium: Selhurst Park; Attendance: 18,084; Referee: Robbie Hart (Darlington)

28 August 1994 2	Liverpool	3–0	Arsenal	Liverpool
16:00	Fowler 26', 29', 31'	Report		Stadium: Anfield; Attendance: 30,017; Referee: Alan Wilkie (Chester-le-Street)

31 August 1994 3	Southampton	0–2	Liverpool	Southampton
19:30		Report	Fowler 21'; Barnes 78'	Stadium: The Dell; Attendance: 15,190; Referee: Martin Bodenham (Looe)

10 September 1994 4	Liverpool	0–0	West Ham United	Liverpool
15:00		Report	Cottee (red card) 54'	Stadium: Anfield; Attendance: 30,907; Referee: Paul Danson (Leicester)

17 September 1994 5	Manchester United	2–0	Liverpool	Manchester
15:00	Kanchelskis 71'; McClair 73'	Report		Stadium: Old Trafford; Attendance: 43,740; Referee: Kelvin Morton (Suffolk)

24 September 1994 6	Newcastle United	1–1	Liverpool	Newcastle upon Tyne
15:00	Lee 50'	Report	Rush 70'	Stadium: St. James' Park; Attendance: 34,435; Referee: Philip Don

1 October 1994 7	Liverpool	4–1	Sheffield Wednesday	Liverpool
15:00	Rush 51'; McManaman 54', 86'; Walker 66' (o.g.)	Report	Nolan 33'	Stadium: Anfield; Attendance: 31,493; Referee: Gary Willard (Worthing)

8 October 1994 8	Liverpool	3–2	Aston Villa	Liverpool
15:00	Ruddock 20'; Fowler 26', 57'	Report	Whittingham 37'; Staunton 90+1'	Stadium: Anfield; Attendance: 32,158; Referee: Keith Burge (Tonypandy)

15 October 1994 9	Blackburn Rovers	3–2	Liverpool	Blackburn
15:00	Atkins 52'; Sutton 57', 72'	Report	Fowler 27'; Barnes 59'	Stadium: Ewood Park; Attendance: 30,263; Referee: Brian Hill (Kettering)

22 October 1994 10	Liverpool	3–0	Wimbledon	Liverpool
15:00	McManaman 21'; Fowler 35'; Barnes 64'	Report		Stadium: Anfield; Attendance: 31,139; Referee: Peter Jones (Leicestershire)

29 October 1994 11	Ipswich Town	1–3	Liverpool	Ipswich
15:00	Paz 65'	Report	Barnes 39'; Fowler 56', 59'	Stadium: Portman Road; Attendance: 22,513; Referee: Paul Durkin

31 October 1994 (MNF) 12	Queens Park Rangers	2–1	Liverpool	London
20:00	Sinclair 29'; Ferdinand 85'	Report	Barnes 66'	Stadium: Loftus Road; Attendance: 18,295; Referee: Terry Holbrook (West Midlands)

5 November 1994 13	Liverpool	1–0	Nottingham Forest	Liverpool
15:00	Fowler 14'	Report		Stadium: Anfield; Attendance: 33,329; Referee: Joe Worrall (Warrington)

9 November 1994 14	Liverpool	3–1	Chelsea	Liverpool
19:45	Fowler 9', 10'; Ruddock 25'	Report	J. Spencer 3'; E. Johnsen (yellow card) 68' (red card) 72'	Stadium: Anfield; Attendance: 32,855; Referee: Graham Poll (Tring)

21 November 1994 (MNF) 15	Everton	2–0	Liverpool	Liverpool
20:00	Ferguson 58'; Rideout (90 A)	Report		Stadium: Goodison Park; Attendance: 39,866; Referee: Dermot Gallagher

26 November 1994 16	Liverpool	1–1	Tottenham Hotspur	Liverpool
15:00	Fowler 39' (pen.)	Report	Ruddock 78' (o.g.)	Stadium: Anfield; Attendance: 35,007; Referee: Steve Lodge (Barnsley)

3 December 1994 17	Coventry City	1–1	Liverpool	Coventry
15:00	Flynn 57'	Report	Rush 2'	Stadium: Highfield Road; Attendance: 21,029; Referee: Keith Burge

11 December 1994 (Super Sunday) 18	Liverpool	0–0	Crystal Palace	Liverpool
16:00		Report		Stadium: Anfield; Attendance: 30,972; Referee: Kelvin Morton

18 December 1994 (Super Sunday) 19	Chelsea	0–0	Liverpool	London
16:00	F. Sinclair (yellow card) 31'	Report		Stadium: Stamford Bridge; Attendance: 27,050; Referee: Dermot Gallagher

26 December 1994 20	Leicester City	1–2	Liverpool	Leicester
11:30	S. Thompson (penalty missed) 63'; Simon Grayson (yellow card) 65' (yellow-red card) 82'; I. Roberts 87'	Report	Fowler 67' (pen.); Rush 77'	Stadium: Filbert Street; Attendance: 21,393; Referee: Gerald Ashby (Worcestershire)

28 December 1994 21	Liverpool	2–0	Manchester City	Liverpool
19:45	Phelan 55' (o.g.); Fowler (penalty missed) 80' 82'	Report		Stadium: Anfield; Attendance: 38,122; Referee: Robbie Hart

31 December 1994 22	Leeds United	0–2	Liverpool	Leeds
15:00		Report	Redknapp 18'; Fowler 76'	Stadium: Elland Road; Attendance: 38,563; Referee: Alan Wilkie

2 January 1995 23	Liverpool	4–0	Norwich City	Liverpool
15:00	Scales 14'; Fowler 38', 47'; Rush 83'	Report		Stadium: Anfield; Attendance: 34,709; Referee: Keith Cooper (Pontypridd)

14 January 1995 24	Liverpool	0–1	Ipswich Town	Liverpool
15:00		Report	Tanner 30'	Stadium: Anfield; Attendance: 32,733; Referee: Roger Gifford (Mid Glamorgan)

24 January 1995 25	Liverpool	0–0	Everton	Liverpool
19:45		Report		Stadium: Anfield; Attendance: 39,505; Referee: Brian Hill

4 February 1995 26	Nottingham Forest	1–1	Liverpool	Nottingham
15:00	Collymore 10'	Report	Babb (red card) 52'; Fowler 90+2'	Stadium: City Ground; Attendance: 25,418; Referee: Gary Willard

11 February 1995 27	Liverpool	1–1	Queens Park Rangers	Liverpool
15:00	Scales 71'	Report	Gallen 6'	Stadium: Anfield; Attendance: 35,996; Referee: Dermot Gallagher

25 February 1995 28	Sheffield Wednesday	1–2	Liverpool	Sheffield
15:00	Bart-Williams 14'	Report	Barnes 42'; McManaman 59'	Stadium: Hillsborough; Attendance: 31,964; Referee: David Elleray (Harrow)

4 March 1995 29	Liverpool	2–0	Newcastle United	Liverpool
15:00	Fowler 57'; Rush 63'	Report		Stadium: Anfield; Attendance: 39,300; Referee: Peter Jones

14 March 1995 30	Liverpool	2–3	Coventry City	Liverpool
19:45	Mølby 76' (pen.); Burrows 90+1' (o.g.)	Report	Ndlovu 20', 35' (pen.), 85'	Stadium: Anfield; Attendance: 27,183; Referee: Mike Reed (Birmingham)

19 March 1995 (Super Sunday) 31	Liverpool	2–0	Manchester United	Liverpool
16:00	Redknapp 25'; Bruce 85' (o.g.)	Report		Stadium: Anfield; Attendance: 38,906; Referee: Gerald Ashby

22 March 1995 32	Tottenham Hotspur	0–0	Liverpool	London
19:45	Klinsmann (penalty missed) 72'	Report		Stadium: White Hart Lane; Attendance: 31,988; Referee: Paul Danson

5 April 1995 33	Liverpool	3–1	Southampton	Liverpool
19:45	Rush 28', 53'; Fowler 70' (pen.)	Report	R. Hall 14'	Stadium: Anfield; Attendance: 29,881; Referee: Steve Lodge

9 April 1995 34	Liverpool	0–1	Leeds United	Liverpool
15:00		Report	Deane 30'	Stadium: Anfield; Attendance: 37,454; Referee: Keith Burge

12 April 1995 35	Arsenal	0–1	Liverpool	London
19:45		Report	Fowler 90'	Stadium: Highbury; Attendance: 38,036; Referee: Martin Bodenham

14 April 1995 36	Manchester City	2–1	Liverpool	Manchester
15:15	Summerbee 17'; Gaudino 74'	Report	McManaman 21'	Stadium: Maine Road; Attendance: 27,055; Referee: Joe Worrall

17 April 1995 37	Liverpool	2–0	Leicester City	Liverpool
15:00	Fowler 75'; Rush 80'	Report	Whitlow (yellow card) ?' (yellow-red card) 70'	Stadium: Anfield; Attendance: 36,012; Referee: Graham Poll

29 April 1995 38	Norwich City	1–2	Liverpool	Norwich
15:00	Ullathorne 17'	Report	Harkness 7'; Rush 84'	Stadium: Carrow Road; Attendance: 21,843; Referee: Brian Hill

2 May 1995 39	Wimbledon	0–0	Liverpool	London
19:45		Report		Stadium: Selhurst Park; Attendance: 12,041; Referee: Terry Holbrook

6 May 1995 40	Aston Villa	2–0	Liverpool	Birmingham
15:00	Yorke 25', 36'	Report		Stadium: Villa Park; Attendance: 40,154; Referee: Robbie Hart

10 May 1995 41	West Ham United	3–0	Liverpool	London
19:45	Holmes 29'; Hutchison 60', 62'	Report		Stadium: Boleyn Ground; Attendance: 22,246; Referee: Paul Durkin

14 May 1995 42	Liverpool	2–1	Blackburn Rovers	Liverpool
16:00	Barnes 64'; Redknapp 90+3'	Report	Shearer 20'	Stadium: Anfield; Attendance: 40,014; Referee: David Elleray

=== FA Cup ===
==== Matches ====
7 January 1995 3rd round	Birmingham City	0–0	Liverpool	Bordesley
15:00		Report		Stadium: St Andrew's; Attendance: 25,326; Referee: JL Watson

18 January 1995 3rd round (replay)	Liverpool	1–1 (a.e.t.) (2–0 p)	Birmingham City	Liverpool
19:45	Redknapp 21'	Report	Otto 69'	Stadium: Anfield; Attendance: 36,275; Referee: Jimmy Parker
	Penalties
	Ruddock (penalty missed); Redknapp (penalty scored); Bjørnebye (penalty scored)		M. Ward (penalty missed); McGavin (penalty missed); Daish (penalty missed); G. Cooper (penalty missed)

28 January 1995 4th round	Burnley	0–0	Liverpool	Burnley
15:00		Report		Stadium: Turf Moor; Attendance: 20,551; Referee: Gary Willard

7 February 1995 4th round (replay))	Liverpool	1–0	Burnley	Liverpool
19:45	Barnes 44'; Ruddock (red card) 81'	Report	McMinn (red card) (after FT)	Stadium: Anfield; Attendance: 32,109; Referee: Kelvin Morton

19 February 1995 5th round	Liverpool	1–1	Wimbledon	Liverpool
15:00	Fowler 33'	Report	A. Clarke 2'	Stadium: Anfield; Attendance: 25,124; Referee: Alan Wilkie

28 February 1995 5th round (replay)	Wimbledon	0–2	Liverpool	Selhurst
19:45		Report	Barnes 10'; Rush 38'	Stadium: Selhurst Park; Attendance: 12,553; Referee: Alan Wilkie

11 March 1995 6th	Liverpool	1–2	Tottenham	Liverpool
15:00	Fowler 38'	Report	Sheringham 45+1'; Klinsmann 89'	Stadium: Anfield; Attendance: 39,592; Referee: Martin Bodenham

=== Coca-Cola Cup ===
==== Matches ====
21 September 1994 2nd, 1st leg	Liverpool	2–0	Burnley	Liverpool
19:45	Scales 42'; Fowler 84'	Report		Stadium: Anfield; Attendance: 23,359

5 October 1994 2nd, 2nd leg	Burnley	1–4	Liverpool	Burnley
19:45	Robinson 84'	Report	Redknapp 15', 69'; Fowler 50'; Clough 75'	Stadium: Turf Moor; Attendance: 19,032

25 October 1994 3	Liverpool	2–1	Stoke City	Liverpool
19:45	Rush 4', 56'	Report	Peschisolido 40'	Stadium: Anfield; Attendance: 32,060

30 November 1994 4	Blackburn Rovers	1–3	Liverpool	Blackburn
19:45	Sutton 89'	Report	Rush 19', 53', 71'	Stadium: Ewood Park; Attendance: 30,115

11 January 1995 Q-F	Liverpool	1–0	Arsenal	Liverpool
19:45	Rush 59'	Report		Stadium: Anfield; Attendance: 35,026

15 February 1995 S-F, 1st leg	Liverpool	1–0	Crystal Palace	Liverpool
19:45	Fowler 90+2'	Report		Stadium: Anfield; Attendance: 25,480

8 March 1995 S-F, 2nd leg	Crystal Palace	0–1	Liverpool	London
19:45		Report	Fowler 27'	Stadium: Selhurst Park; Attendance: 18,224

2 April 1995 Final	Liverpool	2–1	Bolton Wanderers	London
17:00	McManaman 37', 68'	Report	Thompson 70'	Stadium: Wembley Stadium; Attendance: 75,595; Referee: Philip Don (Middlesex)

== Statistics ==
=== Appearances and goals ===
No.	Pos	Nat	Player	Total		FA Premier League		FA Cup		League Cup	
No.	Pos	Nat	Player	Apps	Goals	Apps	Goals	Apps	Goals	Apps	Goals
	DF	(Republic of Ireland) IRL	Phil Babb	47	0	33+1	0	6+0	0	7+0	0
	MF	(England) ENG	John Barnes	50	9	38+0	7	6+0	2	6+0	0
	DF	(Norway) NOR	Stig Inge Bjørnebye	44	0	31+0	0	5+1	0	7+0	0
	FW	(England) ENG	Nigel Clough	11	1	3+7	0	0+0	0	1+0	1
	FW	(England) ENG	Robbie Fowler	57	31	42+0	25	7+0	2	8+0	4
	DF	(England) ENG	Steve Harkness	8	1	8+0	1	0+0	0	0+0	0
	GK	(England) ENG	David James	57	0	42+0	0	7+0	0	8+0	0
	FW	(Wales) WAL	Lee Jones	2	0	0+1	0	0+0	0	0+1	0
	DF	(England) ENG	Rob Jones	46	0	31+0	0	7+0	0	8+0	0
	MF	(Republic of Ireland) IRL	Mark Kennedy	6	0	4+2	0	0+0	0	0+0	0
	MF	(England) ENG	Dominic Matteo	8	0	2+5	0	1+0	0	0+0	0
	MF	(England) ENG	Steve McManaman	55	9	40+0	7	7+0	0	8+0	2
	MF	(Denmark) DEN	Jan Mølby	16	2	12+2	2	0+0	0	2+0	0
	MF	(Scotland) SCO	Steve Nicol	5	0	4+0	0	0+0	0	1+0	0
	MF	(England) ENG	Jamie Redknapp	55	6	36+5	3	6+0	1	8+0	2
	DF	(England) ENG	Neil Ruddock	52	2	37+0	2	7+0	0	8+0	0
	FW	(Wales) WAL	Ian Rush	50	19	36+0	12	7+0	1	7+0	6
	DF	(England) ENG	John Scales	49	3	35+0	2	7+0	0	7+0	1
	MF	(England) ENG	Michael Thomas	29	0	16+7	0	2+1	0	1+2	0
	MF	(England) ENG	Mark Walters	23	0	7+11	0	2+2	0	1+0	0
	DF	(England) ENG	Mark Wright	6	0	5+1	0	0+0	0	0+0	0

=== Goalscorers ===
Rank	No.	Pos	Nat	Name	FA Premier League	FA Cup	League Cup	Total
1	23	FW	(England)	Robbie Fowler	25	2	4	31
2	9	FW	(Wales)	Ian Rush	12	1	6	19
3	10	MF	(England)	John Barnes	7	2	0	9
3	17	MF	(England)	Steve McManaman	7	0	2	9
5	15	MF	(England)	Jamie Redknapp	3	1	2	6
6	12	DF	(England)	John Scales	2	0	1	3
7	14	MF	(Denmark)	Jan Mølby	2	0	0	2
7	25	DF	(England)	Neil Ruddock	2	0	0	2
9	7	MF	(England)	Nigel Clough	0	0	1	1
9	22	DF	(England)	Steve Harkness	1	0	0	1
Own goal					4	0	0	4
Totals					65	6	16	87

=== Competition top scorers ===
Competition	Result	Top Scorer
FA Premier League	4th	(England) Robbie Fowler, 25
FA Cup	Sixth round	(England) John Barnes, 2 (England) Robbie Fowler, 2
League Cup	Winners	(Wales) Ian Rush, 6
Overall		(England) Robbie Fowler, 31

== Season overview ==
=== August ===
The only major signing of the season was that of Danish goalkeeper Michael Stensgaard as understudy to David James, following Bruce Grobbelaar's departure to Southampton. Defender Julian Dicks had returned to West Ham United after an unsuccessful season at Anfield, followed by midfielder Don Hutchison just after the start of the season, around the same time that veteran Ronnie Whelan called time on 15 years at Anfield and signed for Southend United.

The league campaign began in style with a 6–1 away win over newly promoted Crystal Palace in which Ian Rush and Steve McManaman both scored twice, with Robbie Fowler and Jan Molby scoring the other goals. Robbie Fowler then managed a hat-trick in less than five minutes in the next game, when Liverpool beat Arsenal 3–0 at Anfield. Fowler was on target again, along with John Barnes, in the next game – a 2–0 win at Southampton.

=== September ===
The month began with Roy Evans breaking the national defender transfer fee with a £3.6 million move for Wimbledon's John Scales, followed 24 hours later by a £3.5 million signing of Coventry's Phil Babb.

Liverpool saw league action just three times in September, and failed to record any wins. The first game was a goalless draw at home to West Ham, followed by a 2–0 defeat at Manchester United before Ian Rush scored Liverpool's only league goal of the month in a 1–1 away draw with Newcastle United. The Reds were sixth in the league, which was being led by Newcastle.

The League Cup quest began on 21 September, in which John Scales scored his first goal for the club and was joined on the scoresheet by Robbie Fowler in a 2-0 second-round first-leg win over Burnley at Turf Moor.

=== October ===
October saw mixed results for Liverpool, who were beaten 3-2 by Kenny Dalglish's title chasers Blackburn Rovers at Ewood Park before recording a 3–0 home win over Wimbledon and a 3–1 away win over Ipswich Town. The month ended on a sour note with a 2–1 defeat at QPR.

Liverpool eliminated Burnley from the League Cup with a 4–1 win in the second leg, in which Jamie Redknapp was on the scoresheet twice and Nigel Clough scored what would be his only goal of the season. In the next round, Ian Rush scored twice as the Reds defeated Stoke City 2–1 at Anfield.

The Reds ended October in fifth place, with Newcastle still leading the way, newly promoted Nottingham Forest second and pushing hard for a rare title one season after promotion, followed by Manchester United and Blackburn.

=== November ===
A goal from Robbie Fowler on 5 November gave Liverpool a 1–0 home win over fellow title challengers Nottingham Forest at Anfield. Fowler then scored twice in the next game, a 3–1 win home win over Chelsea. Liverpool were then on the losing side in the Merseyside derby at Goodison Park, where a struggling Everton won 2–0. The month ended with a 1–1 home draw against Tottenham Hotspur. The League Cup quest continued at the end of the month when an Ian Rush hat-trick disposed of Blackburn in the fourth round at Ewood Park. The Reds ended the month fourth in the Premier League, six points behind leaders Blackburn.

=== December ===
Liverpool were unbeaten in the six league games they played in December, but the first three of those were draws so the subsequent wins over Leicester City, Manchester City and Leeds United restricted them to third place in the league when wins from those first three games would have put them just one point behind leaders Blackburn.

=== January ===
The first month of 1995 saw the departure of Liverpool's longest serving player Steve Nicol, who signed for Division One strugglers Notts County after losing his place in the first team to new arrivals John Scales and Phil Babb.

However, the year began on a bright note with a 4–0 home win over Norwich City. Then came a 1–0 defeat at home to struggling Ipswich, followed by a goalless draw in the second Merseyside derby of the season at Anfield.

There was success in the cup competitions as an Ian Rush goal gave the Reds 1–0 win over Arsenal in the League Cup quarter-final. However, it took a penalty shoot-out in a replay to see off Division Two underdogs Birmingham City in the FA Cup third round, while Division One strugglers Burnley faced Liverpool again after the League Cup meeting to hold the Reds to a goalless draw at Turf Moor, forcing yet another replay against lower league opposition.

=== February ===
Another quiet month for league action saw the Reds held to 1-1 draws with Forest and QPR before scraping to a 2–1 win away to Sheffield Wednesday. As had happened last month, the biggest news for Liverpool was in the cup competitions. The FA Cup fourth round replay saw them overcome Burnley 1–0, before a fifth round clash with Wimbledon ended in a 1–1 draw and forced another replay, which the Reds won 2–0. Then came the League Cup semi-final first leg at Anfield, in which a Robbie Fowler goal saw the Reds defeat Crystal Palace (battling relegation but chasing glory in both cup competitions) 1–0.

With 15 points behind leaders Blackburn (though with two games in hand) and occupying fourth place, Liverpool's hopes of a league title win and a unique domestic treble had faded considerably.

=== March ===
March brought the familiar pattern for Liverpool of mixed results in the league but good form in the cups. Wins over title hopefuls Manchester United and Newcastle but a home defeat by relegation-threatened Coventry and an away draw with Tottenham Hotspur saw them fall to fifth place in the table and leave their title hopes almost completely dead. The FA Cup fifth round replay against Wimbledon saw Liverpool win 2–0, but their hopes of glory ended in the quarter-finals when they 2–1 at home to Tottenham Hotspur. However, the League Cup campaign continued with another 1–0 win over Crystal Palace and another goal from Robbie Fowler in the second leg of the semi-final, to book the Reds a Wembley date with Bolton Wanderers and a chance of becoming the first team to win the League Cup five times.

=== April ===
The League Cup final at Wembley Stadium on 2 April 1995 saw Liverpool beat Bolton 2–1 with a brace from Steve McManaman giving Roy Evans the first major trophy of his managerial career, and Liverpool's first major trophy since the FA Cup in 1992. With a place in the UEFA Cup guaranteed for next season and the title now beyond reasonable hope for Liverpool, there was less pressure on them in the final few games of the season, and they looked well placed to finish higher in the league than they had in any of the previous three seasons. Four wins and two defeats from six games made the previously crucial top-five finish a near certainty anyway.

=== May ===
A draw with Wimbledon and defeats to two sides climbing clear of relegation danger (Aston Villa and West Ham United) were of little importance to a Liverpool side who could no longer win the title but had already booked European action with their League Cup glory. There was, however, one more game left to play. The final game of the league season was at Anfield on 14 May, and the opponents were Blackburn. Kenny Dalglish's new team were two points ahead of Manchester United – the last side capable of catching them – and a win for them would secure their first league title since 1914. However, if they lost or drew and Manchester United won at West Ham, the title would remain at Old Trafford for the third successive season. There was speculation that Liverpool would give their old manager an easy ride and let him add to the three title success he had managed them to in his time there, but Roy Evans dismissed such talk and his Liverpool side defeated Dalglish's men 2–1. The stadium was a scene of jubilation after the final whistle when news came through that the game in east London had ended in a 1–1 draw and Blackburn had ended their 81-year title wait.
