= Michael Thomas (footballer, born 1967) =

English footballer

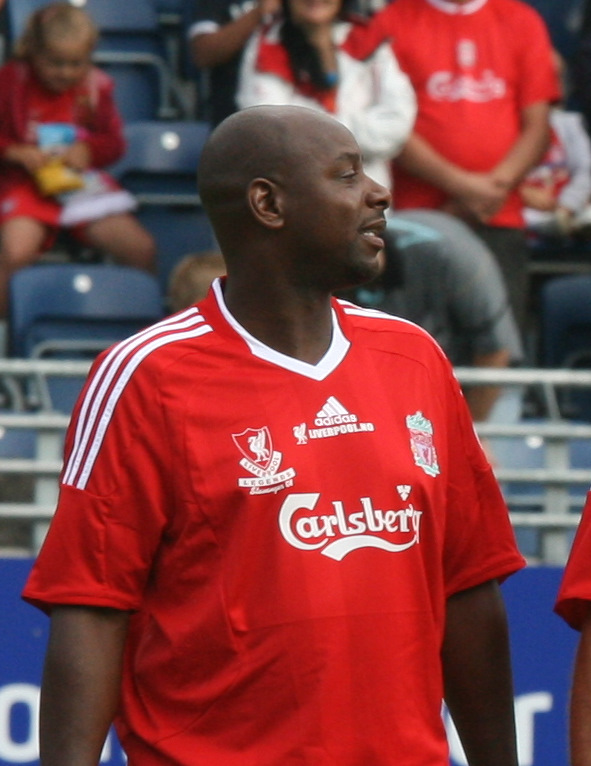
- Thomas playing a charity match for Liverpool in 2008

Personal information
- Full name: Michael Lauriston Thomas
- Date of birth: 24 August 1967 (age 59)
- Place of birth: Lambeth, London, England
- Height: 5 ft 9 in (1.75 m)
- Position: Midfielder

Youth career
- 1982–1984: Arsenal

Senior career*
Years	Team	Apps	(Gls)
1984–1991	Arsenal	163	(24)
1986	→ Portsmouth (loan)	3	(0)
1991–1998	Liverpool	124	(9)
1998	→ Middlesbrough (loan)	10	(0)
1998–1999	Benfica	18	(1)
1999	Benfica B	1	(0)
2000–2001	Wimbledon	8	(0)
Total		327	(34)

International career
1984–1985	England U17	8	(0)
1984–1986	England Youth	7	(0)
1985	England U20	3	(0)
1987–1989	England U21	12	(3)
1989–1992	England B	5	(0)
1988–1989	England	2	(0)
- * Club domestic league appearances and goals

Michael Lauriston Thomas (born 24 August 1967) is an English former professional footballer who played as a midfielder from 1986 to 2001.

During his time at Arsenal, he scored a last-minute goal in injury time during the final match of the 1988–89 season, which allowed the club to claim the First Division title over Liverpool. Two years later, Thomas joined Liverpool and scored the club's opening goal in a 2–0 win in the 1992 FA Cup Final. He also had spells at Benfica and Wimbledon before retiring in 2001, after a career that saw him win medals in all of English football's top three domestic football trophies. He was capped twice by England.

Michael now works as a pundit and media personality, writing a column for Just Arsenal, amongst other things.

== Club career ==
=== Arsenal ===
Thomas was born in Lambeth, London. After growing up as a Tottenham Hotspur fan, he signed for rivals Arsenal as a schoolboy in 1982, turning professional on 31 December 1984 at the age of 17, just months after leaving school. He was loaned out to Portsmouth in early 1987, playing three times, before returning to Arsenal. His Gunners career started with a baptism of fire, as Thomas made his debut in the first leg of a League Cup semi-final against Tottenham Hotspur at Highbury on 8 February 1987.

Thomas soon became a regular in the Arsenal side, making his league debut in place of the suspended Viv Anderson on 14 February 1987 in a 1–1 draw with Sheffield Wednesday at Hillsborough. But, for his next appearance, he was drafted into midfield role at Oxford United. The switch was a quick success, and Thomas extra versatility boosted his chances of a first team place. Just to prove his adaptability he stood in for injured Kenny Sansom and by the end of that campaign he had played 12 league games as Arsenal finished fourth and had a League Cup winners medal, coming on as a late substitute as Arsenal defeated Liverpool at Wembley.

In 1987–88 season, Thomas missed only five league games. He started off as right back following Andersons departure, then switched to midfield for the League Cup semi-final first leg win at Everton in February, and kept that role the rest of the season and finished with 9 goals in the league (2 of them were penalties). Steve Williams February suspension was the perfect opportunity for Thomas to be shifted into central midfield in order to add more energy and dynamism to this area. Arsenal reached the League Cup final again in April 1988, only to lose 3–2 to Luton Town, Thomas also won Arsenal Player of the Season.

The highlight of Thomas's Arsenal career came in the 1988–89 title decider, on 26 May 1989. The First Division match between Liverpool and Arsenal at Anfield had been postponed due to the Hillsborough Disaster, and as a result was moved to the very end of the season, after the FA Cup final. Liverpool had won the FA Cup, and thus had a chance of completing an historic double. Arsenal had been top of the First Division table for most of the season, but Liverpool had overtaken them a few matches before the end of the campaign. Coming into the match, Arsenal were on 73 points with 71 goals for and 36 against (a goal difference of +35), while Liverpool were 3 points ahead on 76 points with 65 goals for and 26 against (a difference of +39). That meant that Arsenal needed to win by at least two goals to take the title (with points and goal difference equal, the team who had scored the most goals would be awarded the title). Liverpool had not lost by two goals at Anfield for nearly four years. After a goalless first half, Alan Smith scored soon after the restart, heading in a free kick from Nigel Winterburn. But as full-time approached it looked as if Arsenal were not going to score the second goal they needed. However, in injury time, in Arsenal's last attack, Thomas surged forward from midfield, running onto a Smith flick-on, evaded a challenge by Steve Nicol, and chipped the advancing goalkeeper Bruce Grobbelaar to score Arsenal's second and win the title, Arsenal's first in eighteen years. The match was later featured in detail in a 1997 film based on the Nick Hornby book Fever Pitch. Thomas started in 33 league games in the title winning season, and scored 7 goals. He formed a brilliant midfield partnership with Kevin Richardson. The goal is often considered one of the greatest moments in Arsenal's entire history.

In 1989-90, Thomas only missed six league games, but because of an ankle injury against Tottenham Hotspur 20 January 1990, his form suffered. He was in the England squad, and among the substitutes, when Brazil came to Wembley 28 March 1990, but the injury wrecked his chances of going to the World Cup Finals.

In 1990-91, Thomas played in 31 league games and was an important part of the League Championship-winning side. His dynamism in the centre of the park complemented Paul Davis, strengthening Arsenal in the process. Together, Thomas and Davis formed one of the club's most notable midfield partnerships, developing a strong bond over time. Thomas's movement, stamina and ability to make runs on and off the ball were of his play style. His constant activity on the pitch often placed him at the center of the team’s performance in matches.

David Rocastle, who was back from his injuries, was switched into central midfield. However, after playing in only ten league games in 1991-92, Thomas lost his place to the more defensive David Hillier. During the championship run-in Thomas appeared in the Daily Mirror, under the headline "My Highbury Hell", criticising Arsenal manager George Graham. The Football Association took stern action and fined Thomas £3,000, and his relationship with Graham was beyond repair, reflected in a 1-0 loss in his final Arsenal match against West Ham United 2 November 1991 at Highbury.

As a result, he was sold to Liverpool, with their manager Graeme Souness paying the Gunners £1.5 million for Thomas's services on 13 December 1991. In all, Thomas played 206 matches, scoring 30 goals for Arsenal, and was named the 37th greatest player in the history of Arsenal in an online poll on the Arsenal website in June 2008.

=== Liverpool ===
Thomas made his Liverpool debut five days after signing, on 18 December 1991. In a repeat of his Arsenal debut, his first match for Liverpool was against Tottenham Hotspur (though this time at White Hart Lane), coming on as a substitute for Jan Mølby in the 56th minute of a 2–1 victory.

Thomas scored his first goal for the Reds on 18 January 1992 in league victory over Oldham Athletic at Boundary Park. His first season at the club culminated with an FA Cup victory at Wembley against Sunderland. After a goalless first 45, Thomas scored the opening goal of the final after 47 minutes with a spectacular shot from a Steve McManaman cross. An assist for Ian Rush's second goal sealed Thomas' contribution for his first silverware with Liverpool. However, after that, injuries began to blight Thomas's time at Anfield. He became a squad player who was largely used as cover for the likes of Jamie Redknapp and John Barnes.

The 1994–95 season saw Thomas claim his only other winner's medal during his time at Anfield, when the Reds won the League Cup final against Bolton Wanderers. Thomas was an unused substitute on the bench during that game, which saw McManaman scoring both the team's goals as Liverpool won 2–1. Thomas then helped Liverpool reach the 1996 FA Cup final, where he saw five minutes of action after coming on as an 85th-minute substitute for Rob Jones. He couldn't help the Reds prevent a 1–0 defeat at the hands of Manchester United. 1996–97 was a disappointing campaign for a Liverpool side who finished fourth in the Premier League after leading it during the winter, but Thomas re-emerged as a first team regular following the absence of Jamie Redknapp due to injury problems. However, when Redknapp was fully fit for the 1997–98 season, Thomas found himself on the sidelines again.

An £800,000 bid from Coventry City was accepted in early December 1997, but the transfer never happened. On 2 February 1998, Thomas was allowed to go out on loan to Middlesbrough, and made his debut two days later on 4 February in a 3–0 league win over Tranmere Rovers at the Riverside Stadium. He played 10 times for the Boro before he returned to Anfield. By this time manager Roy Evans was fielding Øyvind Leonhardsen and Danny Murphy ahead of Thomas, which led to him being surplus to requirements at Anfield. Thomas's impression on the Anfield faithful during his time at the club was confirmed when he was voted in at No. 83 in 100 Players Who Shook The Kop, a poll conducted by Liverpool FC's official website in 2006 with over 110,000 fans voting.

=== Benfica and Wimbledon ===
Portuguese side Benfica, then managed by former Liverpool boss Graeme Souness, took Thomas to the Estádio da Luz on 1 August 1998, but his stay in Lisbon was an unsuccessful one as he found himself banished to the reserves after Souness was replaced by Jupp Heynckes. After two years with Benfica, he returned to England on 29 July 2000 to join Wimbledon, but after a single season in which he played nine times he retired from playing on 31 May 2001.

== International career ==
Thomas was first called up to the England squad under manager Bobby Robson.

His debut came on 16 November 1988, at the age of 21, in the 1–1 friendly draw against Saudi Arabia in Riyadh, thus becoming the first player in Arsenal's history to play at five different levels for his country. Thomas made his second and final England senior appearance just over a year later, on 13 December 1989 in a 2–1 friendly win over Yugoslavia.

== Personal life ==
After retiring from football, Thomas set up his own security service. He plays for the Liverpool legends team and resides in Liverpool.

In 2019, Thomas featured as a guest substitute player in series one of the ITV show Harry's Heroes, which featured former football manager Harry Redknapp attempting get a squad of former England international footballers back fit and healthy for a game against Germany legends.

== Career statistics ==
=== International ===
Appearances and goals by national team and year
National team	Year	Apps	Goals
England	1988	1	0
England	1989	1	0
Total		2	0

== Honours ==
Arsenal

- Football League First Division: 1988–89, 1990–91
- Football League Cup: 1986–87; runner-up: 1987–88
- FA Charity Shield: 1991

Liverpool

- FA Cup: 1991–92; runner-up: 1995–96
- Football League Cup: 1994–95

Individual

- Arsenal Player of the Season Award: 1987−88
