= 1997–98 Liverpool F.C. season =

English football club season

Liverpool F.C.
1997–98 season
- Manager: Roy Evans
- Stadium: Anfield
- Premier League: 3rd
- FA Cup: Third round
- League Cup: Semi-finals
- UEFA Cup: Second round
- Top goalscorer: League: Michael Owen (18); All: Michael Owen (23)
- Highest home attendance: 44,532 vs. Bolton Wanderers (7 March 1998)
- Lowest home attendance: 34,705 vs. Sheffield Wednesday (13 September 1997)
- Average home league attendance: 40,628
Home colours	Away colours

The 1997–98 Liverpool F.C. season was the 106th season in the club's existence, and their 36th consecutive year in the top-flight of English football. In addition to the Premier League, the club also competed in the FA Cup, League Cup, and the UEFA Cup.

== Season summary ==
Liverpool's season saw them feature regularly in the title race, though in the end they just couldn't get the better of champions Arsenal and runners-up Manchester United. But the real success of the season was the emergence of 18-year-old striker Michael Owen. The Chester-born youngster had impressed in a handful of appearances during 1996–97, but his impact during 1997–98 was outstanding—18 goals from 36 Premier League games, especially after Robbie Fowler was ruled out for much of the campaign with a broken leg. In midfield, the arrival of Paul Ince sought to add steel to a side creatively centred on playmaker Steve McManaman, but the team were at the peak of their Spice Boys era, and underachieved in the end, eventually finishing in third place – meaning that Liverpool would be challenging in the UEFA Cup for 1998–99.

== Players ==
=== First-team squad ===
Note: Flags indicate national team as defined under FIFA eligibility rules; some limited exceptions apply. Players may hold more than one non-FIFA nationality.

No.	Pos.	Nation	Player
1	GK	ENG	David James
2	DF	ENG	Rob Jones
3	DF	NOR	Bjørn Tore Kvarme
4	DF	IRL	Jason McAteer (Note: McAteer was born in Tranmere, England, but also qualified to represent the Republic of Ireland internationally and made his international debut for the Republic of Ireland in March 1994.)
5	DF	ENG	Mark Wright
6	DF	IRL	Phil Babb (Note: Babb was born in Lambeth, England, but also qualified to represent the Republic of Ireland internationally and made his international debut for the Republic of Ireland in 1994.)
7	MF	ENG	Steve McManaman
8	MF	NOR	Oyvind Leonhardsen
9	FW	ENG	Robbie Fowler
11	MF	ENG	Jamie Redknapp
12	DF	ENG	Steve Harkness
13	FW	GER	Karl-Heinz Riedle
14	DF	ENG	Neil Ruddock

No.	Pos.	Nation	Player
15	MF	CZE	Patrik Berger
16	MF	ENG	Michael Thomas
17	MF	ENG	Paul Ince (captain)
18	FW	ENG	Michael Owen
19	DF	IRL	Mark Kennedy
20	DF	NOR	Stig Inge Bjørnebye
21	DF	ENG	Dominic Matteo (Note: Matteo was born in Dumfries, Scotland, but was raised in England from the age of four and represented them at U-21 and B level before making his international debut for Scotland in November 2000.)
22	GK	ENG	Tony Warner (Note: Warner was born in Liverpool, England, but also qualified to represent Trinidad and Tobago internationally and would make his international debut for Trinidad and Tobago in February 2006.)
23	DF	ENG	Jamie Carragher
24	MF	ENG	Danny Murphy
25	MF	ENG	David Thompson
29	GK	USA	Brad Friedel

=== Reserve squad ===
Note: Flags indicate national team as defined under FIFA eligibility rules; some limited exceptions apply. Players may hold more than one non-FIFA nationality.

No.	Pos.	Nation	Player
26	GK	DEN	Jørgen Nielsen
27	FW	SCO	Paul Dalglish
28	MF	AUS	Nick Rizzo
30	MF	ISL	Haukur Ingi Guðnason
31	DF	WAL	Gareth Roberts
32	MF	WAL	Danny Williams
—	DF	ENG	Neil Murphy
—	DF	ENG	Stephen Wright

No.	Pos.	Nation	Player
—	DF	WAL	Eifion Jones
—	DF	IRL	Paul O'Mara
—	MF	ENG	Jamie Cassidy
—	MF	ENG	Steven Gerrard
—	MF	ENG	Adriano Rigoglioso
—	MF	WAL	Layton Maxwell
—	FW	ENG	Jon Newby

== Statistics ==
=== Appearances and goals ===
No.	Pos	Nat	Player	Total		Premier League		FA Cup		League Cup		UEFA Cup	
No.	Pos	Nat	Player	Apps	Goals	Apps	Goals	Apps	Goals	Apps	Goals	Apps	Goals
Goalkeepers
1	GK	(England) ENG	David James	37	0	27	0	1	0	5	0	4	0
29	GK	(United States) USA	Brad Friedel	11	0	11	0	0	0	0	0	0	0
Defenders
2	DF	(England) ENG	Rob Jones	26	0	20+1	0	0	0	2	0	3	0
3	DF	(Norway) NOR	Bjørn Tore Kvarme	30	0	22+1	0	1	0	2	0	4	0
5	DF	(England) ENG	Mark Wright	7	0	6	0	0	0	0	0	1	0
6	DF	(Republic of Ireland) IRL	Phil Babb	20	0	18+1	0	0	0	0	0	1	0
12	DF	(England) ENG	Steve Harkness	31	0	24+1	0	1	0	3+1	0	1	0
14	DF	(England) ENG	Neil Ruddock	4	0	2	0	0	0	1	0	1	0
20	DF	(Norway) NOR	Stig Inge Bjørnebye	32	0	24+1	0	0	0	3	0	4	0
21	DF	(Scotland) SCO	Dominic Matteo	33	0	24+2	0	1	0	4	0	2	0
23	DF	(England) ENG	Jamie Carragher	23	0	17+3	0	0	0	2	0	1	0
Midfielders
4	MF	(Republic of Ireland) IRL	Jason McAteer	26	2	15+6	2	1	0	3	0	1	0
7	MF	(England) ENG	Steve McManaman	46	12	36	11	1	0	5	0	4	1
8	MF	(Norway) NOR	Øyvind Leonhardsen	36	6	27+1	6	1	0	3+2	0	2	0
11	MF	(England) ENG	Jamie Redknapp	26	5	20	3	1	1	3	1	2	0
15	MF	(Czech Republic) CZE	Patrik Berger	28	4	6+16	3	0+1	0	2+1	1	1+1	0
16	MF	(England) ENG	Michael Thomas	13	1	10+1	1	0	0	1	0	1	0
17	MF	(England) ENG	Paul Ince	40	8	31	8	1	0	4	0	4	0
19	MF	(Republic of Ireland) IRL	Mark Kennedy	1	0	0+1	0	0	0	0	0	0	0
24	MF	(England) ENG	Danny Murphy	17	0	6+10	0	0+1	0	0	0	0	0
25	MF	(England) ENG	David Thompson	5	1	1+4	1	0	0	0	0	0	0
Forwards
9	FW	(England) ENG	Robbie Fowler	28	13	19+1	9	1	0	4	3	3	1
13	FW	(Germany) GER	Karl-Heinz Riedle	34	7	18+7	6	1	0	2+3	0	1+2	1
18	FW	(England) ENG	Michael Owen	44	23	34+2	18	0	0	4	4	3+1	1
Players transferred out during the season

Last updated: 15 May 1998
Source: Competitions

=== Goalscorers ===
Rank	No.	Pos	Nat	Name	Premier League	FA Cup	League Cup	UEFA Cup	Total
1	18	FW	(England)	Michael Owen	18	0	4	1	23
2	9	FW	(England)	Robbie Fowler	9	0	3	1	13
3	7	MF	(England)	Steve McManaman	11	0	0	1	12
4	17	MF	(England)	Paul Ince	8	0	0	0	8
5	13	FW	(Germany)	Karl-Heinz Riedle	6	0	0	1	7
6	8	MF	(Norway)	Øyvind Leonhardsen	6	0	0	0	6
7	11	MF	(England)	Jamie Redknapp	3	1	1	0	5
8	15	MF	(Czech Republic)	Patrick Berger	3	0	1	0	4
9	4	MF	(Republic of Ireland)	Jason McAteer	2	0	0	0	2
10	16	MF	(England)	Michael Thomas	1	0	0	0	1
10	25	MF	(England)	David Thompson	1	0	0	0	1
Totals					68	1	9	4	82

=== Competition top scorers ===
Competition	Result	Top Scorer
Premier League	3rd	(England) Michael Owen, 18
UEFA Cup	Second round	(England) Robbie Fowler (England) Steve McManaman (England) Michael Owen (Germany) Karl-Heinz Riedle, 1
FA Cup	Third round	(England) Jamie Redknapp, 1
League Cup	Semi-finals	(England) Michael Owen, 4
Overall		(England) Michael Owen, 23

== Competitions ==
=== Premier League ===
==== League table ====
Pos	Team	Pld	W	D	L	GF	GA	GD	Pts	Qualification or relegation
1	Arsenal (C)	38	23	9	6	68	33	+35	78	Qualification for the Champions League group stage
2	Manchester United	38	23	8	7	73	26	+47	77	Qualification for the Champions League second qualifying round
3	Liverpool	38	18	11	9	68	42	+26	65	Qualification for the UEFA Cup first round
4	Chelsea	38	20	3	15	71	43	+28	63	Qualification for the Cup Winners' Cup first round (Note: Chelsea qualified for the Cup Winners' Cup as defending champions. As they were also the League Cup winners, the UEFA Cup berth vacated was awarded to Blackburn Rovers.)
5	Leeds United	38	17	8	13	57	46	+11	59	Qualification for the UEFA Cup first round (Note: Aston Villa was rewarded entry to the UEFA Cup through UEFA Fair Play ranking.)

Source: Premier League
Rules for classification: 1) points; 2) goal difference; 3) number of goals scored.
(C) Champions

==== Results by round ====
Round	1	2	3	4	5	6	7	8	9	10	11	12	13	14	15	16	17	18	19	20	21	22	23	24	25	26	27	28	29	30	31	32	33	34	35	36	37	38
Ground	A	H	A	A	H	A	H	A	H	A	H	A	H	H	A	H	A	H	H	A	H	A	H	H	H	A	H	A	H	A	A	A	H	A	A	H	H	A
Result	D	L	D	W	W	D	W	L	W	L	W	D	W	L	W	L	W	W	W	W	W	D	W	D	L	D	D	L	W	D	W	D	W	D	L	W	W	L
Position	11	14	16	12	6	6	6	5	6	5	6	5	5	5	6	5	6	4	4	4	3	2	3	4	4	4	4	5	4	3	3	3	3	3	3	3	3	3

Source: Premier League
A = Away; H = Home; W = Win; D = Draw; L = Loss; P = Postponed; = Leader, 1998–99 UEFA Champions League Group stage; = 1998–99 UEFA Champions League Second Qualifying round; = 1998–99 UEFA Cup First round; = Relegation to 1998–99 Football League

==== Matches ====
9 August 1997 1	Wimbledon	1–1	Liverpool	London
15:00	Gayle 55'		Owen 70' (pen.)	Stadium: Selhurst Park; Attendance: 26,106; Referee: Gary Willard

13 August 1997 2	Liverpool	1–2	Leicester City	Liverpool
	Ince 85'		Elliott 1'; Fenton 83'	Stadium: Anfield; Attendance: 35,007; Referee: Jeff Winter

23 August 1997 3	Blackburn Rovers	1–1	Liverpool	Blackburn
	Dahlin 85'		Owen 52'	Stadium: Ewood Park; Attendance: 30,187; Referee: Steve Lodge

26 August 1997 4	Leeds United	0–2	Liverpool	Leeds
			McManaman 23'; Riedle 75'	Stadium: Elland Road; Attendance: 39,775; Referee: Alan Wilkie

13 September 1997 5	Liverpool	2–1	Sheffield Wednesday	Liverpool
	Ince 55'; Thomas 68'		Collins 80'	Stadium: Anfield; Attendance: 34,705; Referee: Graham Poll

20 September 1997 6	Southampton	1–1	Liverpool	Southampton
	Davies 48'		Riedle 37'	Stadium: The Dell; Attendance: 15,252; Referee: Peter Jones

22 September 1997 7	Liverpool	3–0	Aston Villa	Liverpool
20:00	Fowler 56' (pen.); McManaman 79'; Riedle 90'			Stadium: Anfield; Attendance: 34,843; Referee: Martin Bodenham

27 September 1997 8	West Ham United	2–1	Liverpool	London
	Hartson 16'; Berkovic 65'		Fowler 52'	Stadium: Upton Park; Attendance: 25,908; Referee: Dermot Gallagher

5 October 1997 9	Liverpool	4–2	Chelsea	Liverpool
16:00	Berger 20', 35', 57'; Fowler 64'		Zola 22'; Poyet 85' (pen.)	Stadium: Anfield; Attendance: 36,647; Referee: David Elleray

18 October 1997 10	Everton	2–0	Liverpool	Liverpool
	Ruddock 45' (o.g.); Cadamarteri 75'			Stadium: Goodison Park; Attendance: 40,112; Referee: Mike Reed

25 October 1997 11	Liverpool	4–0	Derby County	Liverpool
	Fowler 27', 84'; Leonhardsen 65'; McManaman 88'			Stadium: Anfield; Attendance: 38,017; Referee: Gary Willard

1 November 1997 12	Bolton Wanderers	1–1	Liverpool	Manchester
	Blake 84'		Fowler 1'	Stadium: Reebok Stadium; Attendance: 25,000; Referee: Dermot Gallagher

8 November 1997 13	Liverpool	4–0	Tottenham Hotspur	Liverpool
	McManaman 48'; Leonhardsen 50'; Redknapp 65'; Owen 86'			Stadium: Anfield; Attendance: 38,006; Referee: Steve Lodge

22 November 1997 14	Liverpool	0–1	Barnsley	Liverpool
			Ward 35'	Stadium: Anfield; Attendance: 41,011; Referee: Jeff Winter

30 November 1997 15	Arsenal	0–1	Liverpool	London
16:00			McManaman 55'	Stadium: Highbury; Attendance: 38,094; Referee: Graham Poll

6 December 1997 16	Liverpool	1–3	Manchester United	Liverpool
	Fowler 60' (pen.)		Cole 51', 74'; Beckham 70'	Stadium: Anfield; Attendance: 41,027; Referee: David Elleray

13 December 1997 17	Crystal Palace	0–3	Liverpool	London
			McManaman 39'; Owen 56'; Leonhardsen 61'	Stadium: Selhurst Park; Attendance: 25,790; Referee: Neale Barry

20 December 1997 18	Liverpool	1–0	Coventry City	Liverpool
	Owen 14'			Stadium: Anfield; Attendance: 39,707; Referee: Paul Alcock

26 December 1997 19	Liverpool	3–1	Leeds United	Liverpool
	Owen 46'; Fowler 79', 83'		Haaland 84'	Stadium: Anfield; Attendance: 43,854; Referee: Steve Lodge

28 December 1997 20	Newcastle United	1–2	Liverpool	Newcastle
17:00	Watson 16'		McManaman 31', 43'	Stadium: St James' Park; Attendance: 36,702; Referee: Gerald Ashby

10 January 1998 21	Liverpool	2–0	Wimbledon	Liverpool
	Redknapp 71', 84'			Stadium: Anfield; Attendance: 38,011; Referee: Martin Bodenham

17 January 1998 22	Leicester City	0–0	Liverpool	Leicester
				Stadium: Filbert Street; Attendance: 21,633; Referee: Steve Dunn

20 January 1998 23	Liverpool	1–0	Newcastle United	Liverpool
	Owen 17'			Stadium: Anfield; Attendance: 42,791; Referee: Graham Barber

31 January 1998 24	Liverpool	0–0	Blackburn Rovers	Liverpool
				Stadium: Anfield; Attendance: 43,890; Referee: Paul Durkin

7 February 1998 25	Liverpool	2–3	Southampton	Liverpool
	Owen 24', 90+4'		Hirst 8' (pen.), 90'; Østenstad 85'	Stadium: Anfield; Attendance: 43,550; Referee: Jeff Winter

14 February 1998 26	Sheffield Wednesday	3–3	Liverpool	Sheffield
	Carbone 7'; Di Canio 63'; Hinchcliffe 69'		Owen 27', 73', 78'	Stadium: Hillsborough; Attendance: 35,405; Referee: Mike Reed

23 February 1998 27	Liverpool	1–1	Everton	Liverpool
	Ince 68'		Ferguson 58'	Stadium: Anfield; Attendance: 44,501; Referee: Peter Jones

28 February 1998 28	Aston Villa	2–1	Liverpool	Birmingham
	Collymore 10', 65'		Owen 6' (pen.)	Stadium: Villa Park; Attendance: 39,572; Referee: Graham Poll

7 March 1998 29	Liverpool	2–1	Bolton Wanderers	Liverpool
	Ince 58'; Owen 65'		A. Thompson 7'	Stadium: Anfield; Attendance: 44,532; Referee: Keith Burge

14 March 1998 30	Tottenham Hotspur	3–3	Liverpool	London
	Klinsmann 13'; Ginola 49'; Vega 80'		McManaman 21', 89'; Ince 64'	Stadium: White Hart Lane; Attendance: 30,245; Referee: Uriah Rennie

28 March 1998 31	Barnsley	2–3	Liverpool	Barnsley
	Redfearn 37' (pen.), 85'		Riedle 44', 59'; McManaman 90'	Stadium: Oakwell; Attendance: 18,864; Referee: Gary Willard

10 April 1998 32	Manchester United	1–1	Liverpool	Manchester
	Johnsen 12'		Owen 36'	Stadium: Old Trafford; Attendance: 55,171; Referee: Graham Poll

13 April 1998 33	Liverpool	2–1	Crystal Palace	Liverpool
	Leonhardsen 29'; Thompson 85'		Bent 72'	Stadium: Anfield; Attendance: 43,007; Referee: Graham Barber

19 April 1998 34	Coventry City	1–1	Liverpool	Coventry
	Dublin 47' (pen.)		Owen 33'	Stadium: Highfield Road; Attendance: 22,721; Referee: Neale Barry

25 April 1998 35	Chelsea	4–1	Liverpool	London
	Hughes 11', 78'; Clarke 67'; Flo 72'		Riedle 45'	Stadium: Stamford Bridge; Attendance: 34,639; Referee: Gerald Ashby

2 May 1998 36	Liverpool	5–0	West Ham United	Liverpool
	Owen 4'; McAteer 21', 25'; Leonhardsen 45'; Ince 61'			Stadium: Anfield; Attendance: 44,414; Referee: Jeff Winter

6 May 1998 37	Liverpool	4–0	Arsenal	Liverpool
	Ince 28', 30'; Owen 40'; Leonhardsen 87'			Stadium: Anfield; Attendance: 44,417; Referee: Alan Wilkie

10 May 1998 38	Derby County	1–0	Liverpool	Derby
	Wanchope 63'			Stadium: Pride Park; Attendance: 30,492; Referee: Steve Lodge

=== FA Cup ===
==== Matches ====
3 January 1998 3rd Round	Liverpool	1–3	Coventry	Liverpool
	Redknapp 7'		Huckerby 45'; Dublin 62'; Telfer 87'	Stadium: Anfield; Attendance: 33,388; Referee: Mike Riley

=== League Cup ===
==== Matches ====
15 October 1997 3rd Round	West Brom	0-2	Liverpool	West Bromwich
			Berger 52'; Fowler 89'	Stadium: The Hawthorns; Attendance: 21,986; Referee: Alan Wilkie

18 November 1997 4th Round	Liverpool	3-0	Grimsby	Liverpool
	Owen 27', 45', 57'	Report		Stadium: Anfield; Attendance: 28,515; Referee: Roy Pearson

7 January 1998 Quarter Final	Newcastle United	0-2 (a.e.t.)	Liverpool	Newcastle
			Owen 95'; Fowler 103'	Stadium: St James' Park; Attendance: 33,207; Referee: Dermot Gallagher

27 January 1998 Semi Final 1st Leg	Liverpool	2-1	Middlesbrough	Liverpool
	Redknapp 31'; Fowler 82'		Merson 29'	Stadium: Anfield; Attendance: 33,438; Referee: Gary Willard

18 February 1998 Semi Final 2nd Leg	Middlesbrough	2-0 (3-2 on agg.)	Liverpool	Middlesbrough
	Merson 2' (pen.); Branca 4'			Stadium: Riverside Stadium; Attendance: 29,828; Referee: Paul Durkin

=== UEFA Cup ===
==== Matches ====
16 September 1997 1st Round 1st Leg	Celtic	2-2	Liverpool	Glasgow
	McNamara 53'; Donnelly 74' (pen.)	Report	Owen 6'; McManaman 89'	Stadium: Celtic Park; Attendance: 48,526; Referee: Graziano Cesari

30 September 1997 1st Round 2nd Leg	Liverpool	0-0 (away goals)	Celtic	Liverpool
		Report		Stadium: Anfield; Attendance: 38,205; Referee: Edgar Steinborn

21 October 1997 2nd Round 1st Leg	RC Strasbourg	3-0	Liverpool	Strasbourg
	Zitelli 20' 63'; Conteh 69'	Report		Stadium: Stade de la Meinau; Attendance: 18,813; Referee: Vitor Manuel Melo Pereira

4 November 1997 2nd Round 2nd Leg	Liverpool	2-0 (2-3 on agg.)	RC Strasbourg	Liverpool
	Fowler 63' (pen.); Riedle 84'	Report		Stadium: Anfield; Attendance: 32,426; Referee: Rune Pedersen
