= Redknapp =

Redknapp is a surname. Notable people with the surname include:

- Harry Redknapp (born 1947), manager of various English football clubs (father of Jamie)
- Jamie Redknapp (born 1973), English footballer (son of Harry, ex-husband of Louise)
- Louise Redknapp (born 1974), TV presenter and singer (ex-wife of Jamie)
- Edward Redknapp GM (1908 - 1984) Early recipient of The George Medal for outstanding bravery as a member of ARP rescue party during the London Blitz.. Awarded in 1940.
