= Icon (lifestyle magazine) =

British lifestyle magazine

- Categories: lifestyle magazine
- Frequency: Bimonthly
- Founder: Tim Sherwood, Jamie Redknapp, and Louise Redknapp
- Founded: 2003
- Final issue: 2010
- Country: United Kingdom
- Language: English
- Website: www.iconmagazine.co.uk

Icon magazine was a bi-monthly magazine set up in 2003 by ex-professional footballers Tim Sherwood and Jamie Redknapp as well as Redknapp's wife Louise. The magazine was the first venture of Redknapp Publications and its readership was exclusive as it was not sold in shops and it was aimed at a celebrity readership. Originally intended to be just for professional footballers, it branched out to many other international sports people as well as television personalities, actors and selected first class airport lounges. Official readership stood around 25,000.

The magazine had four sections: StyleIcon, FashionIcon, LifestyleIcon and TravelIcon. Jamie conducted interviews with "A-list" sports stars for the cover articles. The magazine had a cover price of £6 but celebrity subscribers did not officially have to pay for it. Past individual issues could be bought for £15 on the official website.

In August 2008, two pioneers of men's magazines in the UK and USA, Andy Clerkson and Ed Needham, took on the editorial direction of the magazine. Clerkson was General Manager of Maxim USA (2001–2004) and editorial director of Dennis Publishing (2004–2006). Between 1996 and 2006, Needham was the editor of FHM in the UK and USA, managing editor of Rolling Stone, and editor-in-chief of Maxim USA. Clerkson and Needham's publishing company, Grand Parade produced Icon under contract from 2008 to 2010.
