= Robbie Fowler =

English football player & coach (born 1975)

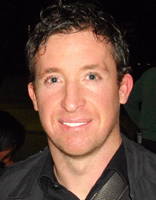
- Fowler in 2011

Personal information
- Full name: Robert Bernard Fowler
- Date of birth: 9 April 1975 (age 51)
- Place of birth: Toxteth, Liverpool, England
- Height: 5 ft 9 in (1.75 m)
- Position: Striker

Youth career
- 1984–1993: Liverpool

Senior career*
Years	Team	Apps	(Gls)
1993–2001	Liverpool	236	(120)
2001–2003	Leeds United	30	(14)
2003–2006	Manchester City	80	(21)
2006–2007	Liverpool	30	(8)
2007–2008	Cardiff City	13	(4)
2008	Blackburn Rovers	3	(0)
2009–2010	North Queensland Fury	26	(9)
2010–2011	Perth Glory	28	(9)
2011–2012	Muangthong United	13	(8)
Total		459	(193)

International career
1993–1995	England U21	8	(3)
1994	England B	1	(1)
1996–2002	England	26	(7)

Managerial career
- 2011–2012: Muangthong United
- 2019–2020: Brisbane Roar
- 2020–2021: East Bengal
- 2023: Al-Qadsiah
- * Club domestic league appearances and goals

Robert Bernard Fowler (born 9 April 1975) is an English football coach and former professional player. He is best known for his time playing for Liverpool, initially from 1993 to 2001.

As a player, Fowler was a striker, and is the ninth-highest goalscorer in the history of the Premier League. Renowned as a natural finisher who was predominantly left-footed, he scored 183 goals in total for Liverpool, and was especially prolific in his first three full seasons when he scored over 30 goals in each of them, earning the nickname "God" from the Kop at Anfield and twice being named PFA Young Player of the Year (1995 and 1996). He is Liverpool's second-top scorer in the Premier League. In 2026 Fowler was listed at number 12 in an official club poll of Liverpool's greatest players.

He subsequently played for Leeds United and Manchester City, before returning to Liverpool in January 2006. He moved to Cardiff City eighteen months later. He played there for a year before transferring to Blackburn Rovers on a short-term deal. In December 2008, he departed Blackburn and played in Australia with North Queensland Fury and Perth Glory. In 2011, he joined Thai side Muangthong United as a player, but later was appointed player-manager, which he remained until his retirement in 2012. He later managed Brisbane Roar in Australia, East Bengal in India, and Al Qadsiah in Saudi Arabia.

Fowler was capped for England 26 times, scoring 7 goals. He was included in England's squads for Euro 1996, Euro 2000 and the 2002 FIFA World Cup.

== Early life ==
Fowler was born in Toxteth, Liverpool, and brought up in the inner city area of Liverpool. At this time he was known as Robert Ryder, his mother's surname. He lived in Toxteth at the time of the 1981 Toxteth riots, when he was six years old. As a youngster he supported Everton and regularly attended home and away games. He played regularly for schoolboy team Thorvald, and once scored 16 times in a 26–0 rout.

== Club career ==
=== Liverpool ===
Despite growing up as an Everton fan, Fowler's career began with Liverpool. He signed as a youth team player on leaving school in the summer of 1991, signing professional terms on his 17th birthday, 9 April 1992.

Fowler's first involvement with the Liverpool first team came on 13 January 1993, when he was an unused substitute in an FA Cup third round tie against Bolton Wanderers. In the following close season, Fowler helped the England under-18 team win the 1993 European Championship, before making a scoring first-team debut in Liverpool's 3–1 win in a second round League Cup tie at Fulham on 22 September 1993. Fowler scored all five goals in the second leg at Anfield two weeks later, making him the fourth player in Liverpool's history to score five in a senior fixture. He scored his first league hat-trick against Southampton on 30 October 1993 in only his fifth league game. His very first league goal for the Reds came on 16 October 1993, when an 87th-minute equaliser at home to Oldham Athletic saved the Reds from what could have been one of the biggest Premier League shocks of the season, with Liverpool finally winning 2–1. He scored twice in a 3–3 draw at Tottenham Hotspur on 18 December 1993.

His first 13 games for the club yielded 12 goals, and he was rewarded with an England Under-21 debut against San Marino in November 1993, in which he scored England's opening goal in the third minute. Fowler was unable to sustain his goal-a-game ratio throughout the season, but finished his first season as the club's second top scorer with 18 goals in all competitions, Ian Rush had scored 19. It was, however, considered by many a disappointing season for Liverpool, as they finished eighth in the Premier League without making an impact in any of the major competitions, though the departure of Graeme Souness as manager and the appointment of Roy Evans as successor built hope for a brighter future at Anfield after the disappointment of the first two FA Premier League seasons.

==== Success and fame ====
During the 1994–95 season Fowler was a constant member of the Liverpool side, playing in all of their 57 competitive matches, including the victory in the 1995 League Cup final, and a match against Arsenal on 28 August 1994 in which he scored what was then the Premier League's fastest hat-trick ever, in four minutes and 33 seconds. His record stood for 20 years until broken by Sadio Mané on 16 May 2015 for Southampton against Aston Villa, who scored three goals in two minutes and 56 seconds. He scored braces against Aston Villa, Ipswich Town, Chelsea and Norwich City in the league that season. For his goalscoring exploits, Fowler was voted the PFA Young Player of the Year in two consecutive years in 1995 and 1996.

Throughout the mid and late 1990s, Fowler was widely considered to be the most natural finisher playing in England. He scored more than 30 goals for three consecutive seasons, up to 1997. He remains the only player to have scored 30 plus goals in his first three full seasons in England, scoring 98 goals with a total of 116 in just over three years. Fowler's combination with the talisman of the team Steve McManaman was largely described as the reason why Liverpool had become the club known for being the most potent attacking force in England at the time, and Fowler was renowned for scoring goals of all varieties, from every angle and distance, with McManaman describing him as the "greatest goalscorer of all time".

The match turned into a battle of the higher powers: Cantona, Le Dieu, against Fowler, who at the age of 20 was already nicknamed God by Liverpool fans. He didn't quite steal the show from Cantona – not even the second coming of Jesus Christ could have done that – but he had a damned good go, scoring two exhilarating goals. It was, he later said, "the game of me life".

— The Guardian on Fowler's two goals at Old Trafford in a 2–2 draw against their arch rivals Manchester United in October 1995 which saw the return of Eric Cantona from his eight-month suspension.

Stan Collymore, Fowler's regular strike partner for two seasons from 1995, said in his autobiography that Fowler was the best player he has ever played alongside. Fowler and Collymore were among the most prolific goal-scoring strike partnerships in England during the 1995–96 season, with £8.4million signing Collymore replacing the veteran Ian Rush as Fowler's regular partner in attack after his arrival in June 1995. In the same season, he scored twice in a 4–3 victory over Newcastle United, a match voted the best of the decade in a Premier League poll. The match helped prevent Newcastle from winning the league, but it was not enough for Liverpool to clinch the title; they finished third while Manchester United were crowned champions. Fowler also played in his first FA Cup final that season, but was on the losing side as Manchester United won 1–0. He had scored four goals against United in the league that season, scoring twice in a 2–2 draw at Old Trafford on 1 October 1995, and twice in a 2–0 win at Anfield on 17 December.

On 14 December 1996, he scored four against Middlesbrough, including his hundredth for Liverpool. This meant he reached a century of goals one game quicker than his first strike partner, Ian Rush, in just 165 games. That year, he also won a UEFA Fair Play award for denying that he had been fouled by Arsenal goalkeeper David Seaman at Highbury after a penalty had been given. After unsuccessfully trying to persuade the referee to change his decision about the penalty, Fowler took it tamely and Seaman saved. However, Seaman failed to hold on to the ball and Jason McAteer scored from the rebound. Although many people believe that he deliberately took the penalty kick poorly for reasons of fair play, Fowler said at the time: "As a goalscorer it's part of my job to take it and I wanted to score it. I tried to score. I never missed on purpose. It just happened, it was a bad penalty."

==== Spice Boys ====
Fowler was part of a group of Liverpool players from the mid-1990s who were dubbed "The Spice Boys" by the press following a series of off-field controversies. The term was subsequently used in a derogatory manner, implying Fowler and colleagues such as Jamie Redknapp, Stan Collymore, David James and Steve McManaman were underachieving playboys. Rob Smyth in The Guardian recalls: "their young side, built around Redknapp, McManaman and Fowler, were perceived by most, including the England manager Terry Venables, to be more promising than [Manchester] United's youngsters", while on the day of their game at Old Trafford in October 1995 Paul Wilson in The Observer wrote: "Liverpool are looking ominously threatening again, with a young team which appears capable of greatness if Roy Evans can keep it together". The "Spice Boys" label had been coined due to rumours that Fowler was dating Emma Bunton of the Spice Girls. Fowler said that his successful career to that point had been "dismissed with contempt by those two tiny words".

"What were incredible times at Anfield – successful, exciting, breathless seasons when I played probably the best football of my career – are dismissed with contempt by those two tiny words."

— Fowler on the "Spice Boys" label given to the Liverpool team of the mid-1990s.

Liverpool were top of the Premier League by Christmas 1996, with three defeats in the first half of the season. By the end of January, they had been leapfrogged by Manchester United, who remained top for the rest of the season, while Liverpool finished 4th.

Fowler showed support for the Liverpool dockers' strike during a goal celebration in a UEFA Cup games against SK Brann in March 1997 where he unveiled a t-shirt which incorporated the Calvin Klein "CK" into the word doCKer. He was fined £900 by UEFA and criticised by manager Roy Evans for the gesture.

Fowler's performance in the 1997–98 football season was marred by an anterior cruciate (knee) ligament injury that kept him out of action for half of the season and caused him to miss the 1998 World Cup. During this period of injury, fellow Liverpool striker, Michael Owen rose to prominence, making his debut in 1997. Owen established himself in the Liverpool team in Fowler's absence and played alongside him when Fowler regained his fitness.

In 1999, Fowler was fined £60,000 by his club for bringing the game into disrepute. While celebrating his goal against Liverpool's Merseyside rivals, Everton, Fowler used the white line of the penalty area to simulate cocaine use. Liverpool manager Gérard Houllier stated that this was a Cameroonian grass-eating celebration, learnt from teammate Rigobert Song. Defending himself, Fowler later said this was a response to Everton fans who had insulted him with false accusations of drug abuse. Fowler received a six-match ban from the FA in April 1999, with four matches for this celebration. Fowler also received a two-match suspension for making alleged homophobic gestures towards Chelsea's Graeme Le Saux.

==== Winning the cup treble ====
The 2000–01 season was Fowler's most successful season. He scored 17 goals, appeared in three finals, and lifted three trophies in a unique cup treble. In the absence of Jamie Redknapp, who was sidelined by injury, Fowler was named as Liverpool captain when he started. However he found himself the third-choice Liverpool striker, with Houllier favouring a forward partnership of Michael Owen and Emile Heskey.

He took part in a fourth-round League Cup hammering of Stoke City, scoring a hat-trick in an 8–0 victory, which was second only to the club's biggest ever win in 1986 – a 10–0 defeat of Fulham. In the League Cup final against Birmingham City, the club's first cup final since 1996, he captained the side and scored with a 25-yard half volley in the 30th minute. Liverpool went on to win the trophy on penalties, with Fowler scoring Liverpool's fifth in the shootout. Fowler picked up the Alan Hardaker Man of the Match award and lifted the trophy.

Fowler's season picked up from there as he scored several important goals including the second in a 2–0 win at Anfield against runaway champions Manchester United and a free kick in the FA Cup semi-final against Wycombe Wanderers. Fowler featured as a substitute in the 2001 FA Cup final against Arsenal coming on as a 77th-minute replacement for Vladimír Šmicer. Liverpool, who were 1–0 down at that point, eventually won the game 2–1 with two late goals from Owen. Fowler raised the trophy along with Sami Hyypiä and Jamie Redknapp.

Four days later he was a substitute again in Liverpool's third final, the 2001 UEFA Cup final against Deportivo Alavés. He came on in the 64th minute for Heskey with the score at 3–3. He scored seven minutes later but Alavés equalised before full-time and Liverpool eventually won with a golden goal, an own goal, in the 116th minute. Fowler and Hyypiä then raised Liverpool's third trophy of the season together. Liverpool's next and final game of the season was against Charlton Athletic and Fowler scored twice in a 4–0 victory at The Valley that assured them 3rd place and UEFA Champions League qualification for the next season.

==== Liverpool departure ====
Fowler began the 2001–02 season controversially, after being dropped by Houllier from the Liverpool squad for the 2001 Charity Shield match. He made an appearance in Liverpool's 3–2 European Super Cup victory over Bayern Munich, but starts were intermittent. In October 2001, he scored his first league hat-trick for three years, helping Liverpool beat Leicester City 4–1, but was dropped for the following league match. Though Fowler had been on a contract extension from 1999 (unlike Steve McManaman – who exercised his Bosman entitlement the very same year), Fowler was linked to Lazio, Arsenal and Leeds United, and Liverpool's management as well as fans and the media constantly reported that what happened with McManaman (regarded as a huge financial loss) would never be repeated and thus the club never rejected those bids without consideration. This meant that coupled with Fowler's relationship with Houllier, speculation over Fowler's future persisted for most of Houllier's tenure and became an issue that divided Liverpool fans. His last appearance for Liverpool was against Sunderland, in which he was substituted at half-time.

=== Leeds United ===
Despite his popularity with Liverpool fans, who referred to Fowler as "God", Michael Owen and Emile Heskey had established themselves as Liverpool's regular strike partnership, leaving Fowler on the fringes of the first team. This, along with his difficult relationship with Houllier, made him seek regular first-team football away from Anfield in the form of a £12 million move to Leeds United. Fowler wrote in a 2005 autobiography that Houllier forced him out of Liverpool, and accused Houllier of pressuring the Liverpool Echo newspaper to use its influence to turn opinion against him.

The transfer went ahead just one month after his hat-trick at Leicester. He made his Leeds debut in an away game against Fulham in December 2001, the same ground where he had made his Liverpool debut eight years earlier. Fowler scored 12 goals in the remainder of the season, helping Leeds to a UEFA Cup qualifying place. Fowler was included in the England squad for the 2002 World Cup, but only made one appearance, coming on as a substitute in a second-round win over Denmark.

Fowler suffered an aggravation of a pre-existing hip injury in the 2002–03 pre-season, and did not recover until December. Struggling to gain fitness, and seeing teammates sold off due to a financial crisis, Fowler's form and market value diminished. It was despite this decrease in form that he still, in total, scored 15 goals in 31 appearances for Leeds; achieving an impressive strike rate of just less than one goal every two games. In 2002–03, Leeds finished 15th in the Premier League and a severe financial crisis was developing.

=== Manchester City ===
In the 2002–03 season, Fowler was transferred to Manchester City following a protracted transfer saga. Fowler initially turned down the move and a dispute between Manchester City manager Kevin Keegan and chairman David Bernstein over whether the transfer should take place due to medical concerns resulted in Bernstein leaving the club. Following encouragement from Keegan, Fowler finally signed for Manchester City on 16 January 2003 for an initial fee of £3 million and a further £3 million dependent upon appearances. Bizarre transfer conditions meant Leeds United still paid a significant proportion of Fowler's wages. Fowler made his Manchester City debut against West Bromwich Albion on 1 February 2003, but made a poor start to his Manchester City career, scoring just two goals in the remainder of the season.

Fowler continued to struggle with fitness problems in the 2003–04 season, completing the full 90 minutes only nine times, however, he did score against his old club, Liverpool, in a 2–2 draw at home. The arrival of close friend Steve McManaman from Real Madrid gave Fowler hope, but the pair failed to rekindle their prolific partnership from their time at Liverpool, and received criticism from the fans and tabloids for their salaries and alleged excesses; they were named and shamed in a sex scandal covered by the News of the World that year.

Despite the slump, Fowler rallied for the following campaign, and showed a marked improvement in the second half of the 2004–05 season, scoring his 150th Premiership goal in the 3–2 win over Norwich City on 28 February 2005. However, his failure to convert a 90th-minute penalty kick against Middlesbrough's Mark Schwarzer in the final game of the season prevented Manchester City from gaining a place in the UEFA Cup. Despite this, Fowler ended the season as the club's joint top goal scorer and gained the approval of the fans, finishing in the top three in the fans' Player of the Year poll. Fowler later described this as "one of the proudest achievements of my career".

Fowler had injury problems at the start of the 2005–06 season and rarely featured when fit, making just two substitute appearances in the first four months of the season. His first start of the season came against Scunthorpe United in the FA Cup on 7 January 2006, in which he scored a hat-trick. The following week he scored Manchester City's third goal in their 3–1 win against local rivals Manchester United after coming on as a substitute. However, Fowler made only one more appearance for Manchester City before returning to Liverpool on a free transfer.

=== Return to Liverpool ===
"Getting that chance to return to Liverpool was the best thing that ever happened to me in football. It was better than winning trophies. I couldn't wait to get that shirt back on and run around in front of the fans at Anfield."

— Fowler on his 2006 return to Liverpool.

On 27 January 2006, Fowler rejoined Liverpool from Manchester City on a free transfer, signing a contract until the end of the season. Fowler was in a bar in Liverpool watching the club's 2005 Champions League semi-final win over Chelsea at Anfield, and following the game he first met manager Rafael Benítez at the bar and told him he would love to come back. Fowler was also in the crowd when Liverpool won the 2005 UEFA Champions League final in Istanbul. Liverpool fans were delighted to learn that Fowler had returned; there were large banners in the game against Birmingham City which read "God – number eleven, welcome back to heaven", with "God" being Fowler's nickname while he was previously at Liverpool.

Fowler's return against Birmingham at Anfield in February 2006 was labelled by the tabloid press as the stuff of fairytales, and he said he felt like "a kid waking up on Christmas morning every day". A substitute against Birmingham, he received a standing ovation upon his introduction. Fowler recalls: "The reception I received when I came on against Birmingham on my return will live with me forever. The noise and Anfield crowd that night were incredible." After his return, he had three goals ruled out for offside, one against Birmingham, before finally getting off the mark on 15 March 2006 in a home game against Fulham, the same opponents against which he scored his first-ever goal for Liverpool 13 years earlier.

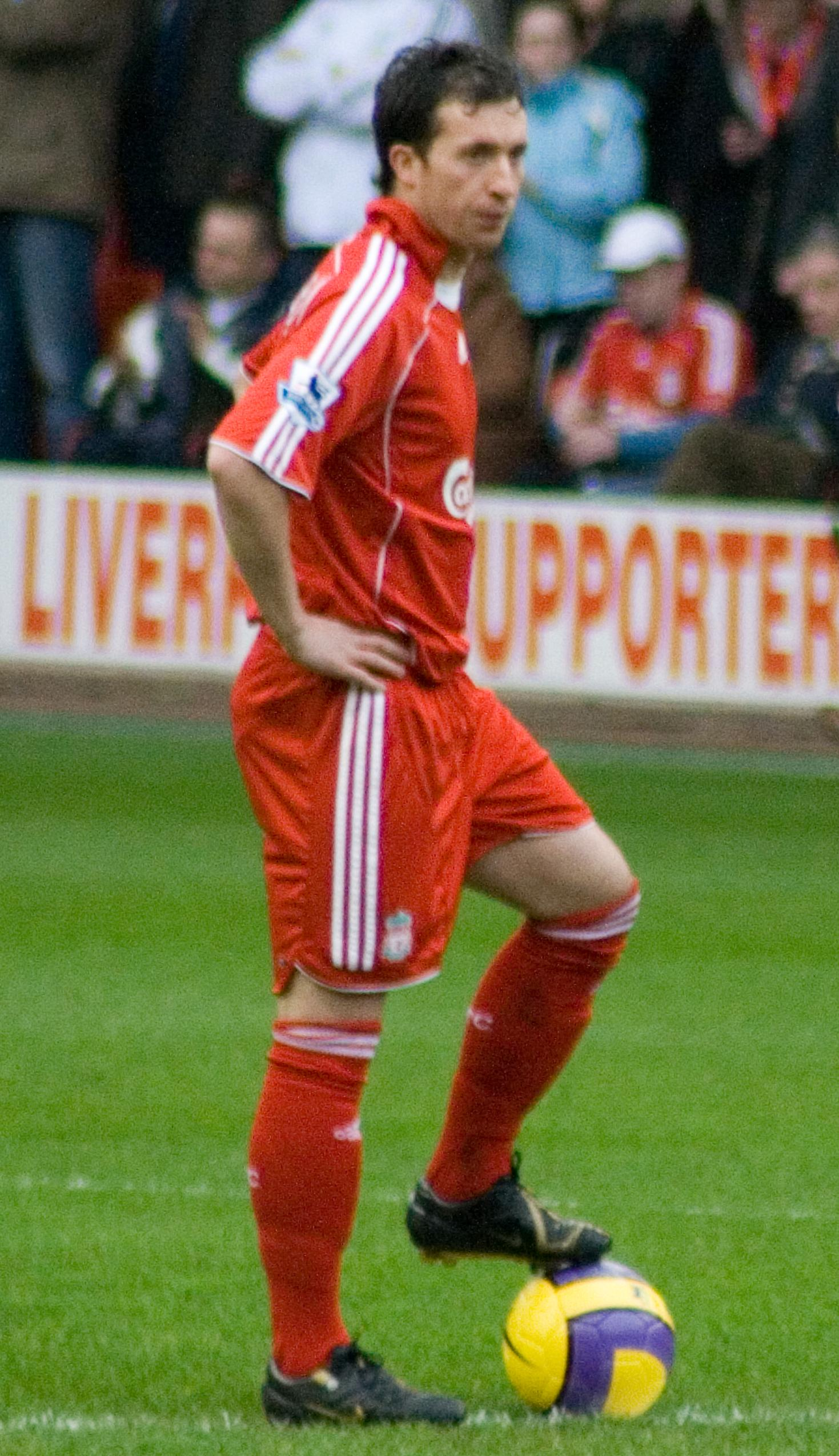
Fowler playing for Liverpool in 2007

Fowler's next Liverpool goal, against West Bromwich Albion, meant he overtook Kenny Dalglish in the club's all-time top scorers. His resurgence continued as he marked his 31st birthday with a goal against Bolton Wanderers. He made it four goals in five games when he scored the only goal in a 1–0 victory over Blackburn Rovers on 16 April 2006. However, Fowler's fitness remained a concern. In March 2006, Benítez commented on Fowler's work and progress by saying, "to buy a Robbie Fowler who is fit and scoring goals would cost a lot, maybe £10m or more". Despite concerns about his fitness, Fowler finished the 2005–06 season scoring on a more consistent basis than Liverpool's other strikers. In May 2006 he was offered a new one-year contract with the club, and celebrated by scoring the first goal in Liverpool's last league game of the season in a 3–1 away win at Portsmouth. It was his final game of the season as he was unable to take part in the club's FA Cup Final success due to being cup-tied.

Fowler featured rarely in his final Liverpool season, making only six league starts. Bizarrely, all three of his League goals were penalties against Sheffield United. One of these was in the away game on the opening day of the season, and the other two in the reverse fixture at Anfield. Appearances in other competitions were more common due to Rafael Benítez's squad rotation policy. On 25 October 2006 Fowler was named as Liverpool's captain for the first time since his return in a League Cup tie against Reading, scoring just before half-time in a 4–3 win. On 5 December, Fowler scored his first two goals in the UEFA Champions League competition proper against Galatasaray (he had previously scored during a qualifying tie some six years prior against FC Haka), though Liverpool lost 3–2.

On 1 May 2007, he was a substitute in the Champions League semi-final against Chelsea, brought on in the last few minutes of extra-time. He set up an attack for Dirk Kuyt but the shot went straight at the Chelsea goalkeeper. The match went into a penalty shoot-out that Liverpool won. Fowler was due to take the fifth and final spot-kick, but the game had already ended when Kuyt slotted home his winning penalty.

In what transpired to be his last appearance for the club, against Charlton Athletic on 13 May, Fowler was given the captain's armband one final time. He was substituted two minutes from the final whistle and given a standing ovation. He finished his second run as a Liverpool player with a UEFA Champions League runners-up medal, although he was not named in either the starting eleven or the seven substitutes. He became a free agent on 1 July having scored 183 goals in 369 appearances during his two spells at the club.

=== Cardiff City ===
On 21 July 2007 Fowler signed a two-year contract to play for Cardiff City. He missed the season's opening fixtures due to a lack of fitness, making his debut in a League Cup tie on 28 August. He scored his first two Cardiff goals on 22 September against Preston North End, scoring with two headers. Fowler scored twice in his next game, a third round League Cup tie against West Brom, which Cardiff won 4–2. This led to a fourth round tie against Fowler's former club Liverpool, at Anfield, to which even the Liverpool faithful crowd urged Fowler to score seeing that it may be the last time he would play in Anfield but Cardiff were knocked out in a 2–1 defeat.

In November, Fowler travelled to Frankfurt, Germany to see Dr. Hans-Wilhelm Müller-Wohlfahrt, a specialist sports injuries doctor, to try and resolve a recurring hip problem that had left him lacking fitness in early season fixtures for the Bluebirds. The treatment involved taking around twenty-eight injections into his hip. He returned to full training in late November and made his comeback on 15 December as a late substitute in a 1–0 defeat against Bristol City. However he went on to suffer another injury blow just days later after a mistimed tackle in training from club captain Darren Purse left him with damaged ankle ligaments. Due to the new injury blow Cardiff and Fowler made plans for him to go to Colorado, United States to undergo keyhole surgery on the hip problem, which had plagued him in recent seasons, in the hope that it would finally resolve the problem.

On 17 January 2008, it was announced that Fowler could miss the rest of the 2007–08 season for Cardiff after his hip operation revealed that the injury was worse than previously thought. Surgeons were forced to perform a micro-fracture for the hip to heal properly. Despite this, he attempted to make a comeback at the end of the season to play in the FA Cup final against Portsmouth and was included in the 18-man match squad. He did not feature in the game in and thus did not receive a runners-up medal having not made an appearance in the competition.

=== Blackburn Rovers ===
Fowler was offered a new pay-as-you-play contract with Cardiff for the 2008–09 season in May 2008 and was expected to sign the contract. However, he pulled out of the deal, preferring to accept an offer of a trial at Blackburn Rovers from former Liverpool colleague Paul Ince. The move left Cardiff manager Dave Jones and chairman Peter Ridsdale furious after the club had assisted Fowler's rehabilitation throughout the summer. After training with Blackburn and appearing in a handful of friendlies he was offered a six-month deal by the club to last until January, Fowler concluded the trial period at Blackburn by agreeing to a three-month pay-as-you-play deal. He stated that he was eager to return to the Premier League and that his pre-existing relationship with Ince would not earn him any preferential treatment. He made his first appearance against Everton in a 1–0 win in the League Cup on 24 September. With a month left on his contract at Blackburn, Fowler received interest from League Two side Grimsby Town. Fowler, a friend of then Grimsby manager Mike Newell had held talks at Blundell Park over a possible Player/Coach role with the club.

His three-month deal at Blackburn expired on 12 December 2008, and after not being offered a new contract was released by the club, he entered talks with new Australian A-League club North Queensland Fury.

=== North Queensland Fury ===
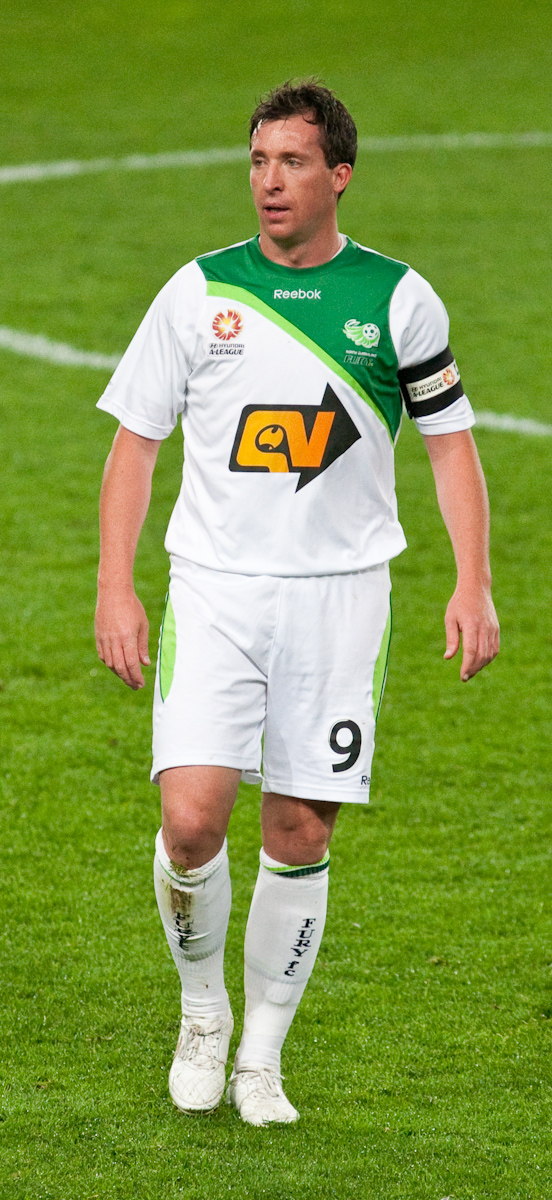
Fowler playing for North Queensland Fury in 2009

Fowler signed with the North Queensland Fury on 4 February 2009 and became their inaugural marquee player; with his family relocating to Townsville for the 2009–10 season of the Australian A-League. It was an important signing for the new franchise who struggled to sign a marquee player, while some questioned whether Fowler would be able to cope with the heat and humidity of North Queensland.

Fowler made his debut in July 2009 in a 2–1 pre-season loss against Wolverhampton Wanderers in Perth after recovering from groin and hip complaints. Fowler was subsequently named North Queensland Fury's captain for the 2009–10 season. He scored his first A-League goal from a penalty kick in his club's first competitive match against Sydney FC on Saturday 8 August 2009. In rounds four, five, and six Fowler scored Solo's Hyundai A-League Goal of the Week.

Shortly after his arrival in Australia, it was reported in the British media that Fowler would be making a swift return to his homeland and sign for League One side Tranmere Rovers, who had just appointed Fowler's former Liverpool teammate John Barnes as manager. However, Fowler was quick to dismiss talk of a quick return to England. When Barnes was dismissed three months later, it was reported that Tranmere had approached Fowler about becoming player-manager, but these reports too were dismissed.

Fowler ended the season collecting a hat-trick of awards at the club's end-of-season awards night, he was awarded the club's Player of the Year, Players' Player of the Year and the Golden Boot as top goal scorer. On 15 June 2010, Fowler confirmed that he was taking legal action over the ending of his playing contract with North Queensland Fury. He was suing the Fury and Football Federation Australia, which took over the running of the club.

=== Perth Glory ===
On 27 April 2010, it was announced that Fowler had agreed to become part of Glory's squad for the 2010–11 A-League season. Fowler reportedly ignored offers from Middle East clubs as well as Sydney FC to play in Perth. He joined the Glory for pre-season training in mid-June, following World Cup sponsorship commitments. Fowler scored his first goal for Perth on 29 August, a penalty against Melbourne Heart. He followed this up with a headed goal the following week against the Wellington Phoenix. In the following match, Fowler's hat-trick gave the Glory a 3–1 victory against Melbourne Victory at the Dairy Farmers Stadium in Townsville. Fowler ended the year as top scorer for the club.

=== Later career ===
On returning to England, Fowler briefly worked with League One side Milton Keynes Dons on an ad hoc basis to assist the club's coaching staff. On 7 April 2011, Bury confirmed that Fowler would join their coaching staff for a week to assist Richie Barker. Fowler then briefly coached Liverpool's strikers in April 2011.

On 7 July 2011, Fowler agreed to play with Muangthong United, signing a one-year contract. In a press conference he stated that the weather conditions of Nonthaburi should not be a problem as he had played in Townsville and Perth. He was quickly a hit with Muangthong fans and the Thai public in general; he attended Thailand's World Cup Qualifier against Oman wearing the national team's shirt. He has since played a handful of scoreless games, both at the Yamaha Stadium and on the road in the AFC Cup, until the Twin Qilins were eliminated from the competition by Al-Kuwait. After the sacking of Henrique Calisto as head coach, Fowler was made player/coach.

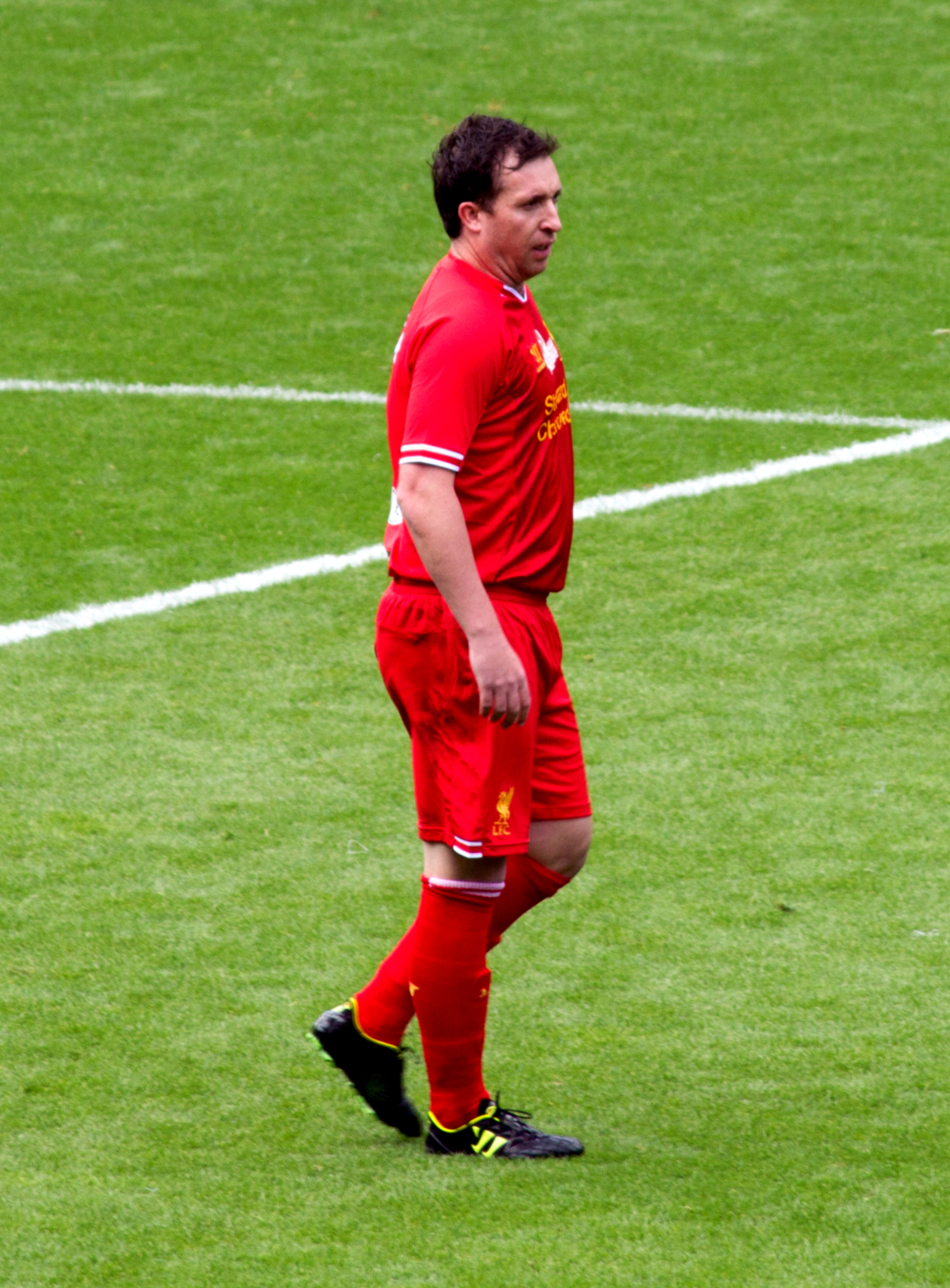
Fowler during Steven Gerrard's testimonial on 3 August 2013

After 250 minutes of play, Fowler scored his first goal for MTU against Chiangrai on 16 October 2011. He scored his 250th club career goal on 21 December 2011 against TTM Phichit. in January 2012, Fowler announced he had left the club, who then appointed Slavisa Jokanovic as coach.

On 1 March 2012, Blackpool manager Ian Holloway confirmed that Fowler was training with the Seasiders and that he could earn a deal until the end of the season. However, they could not agree a deal and Fowler decided against signing when Karl Oyston offered the striker £100 a week.

Fowler was on a six-man shortlist and interviewed for the vacant manager's job at Conference side Macclesfield Town in May 2013, but caretaker manager John Askey was eventually appointed on a full-time basis.

Fowler featured in Steven Gerrard's testimonial match against Olympiacos F.C. on 3 August 2013. He came off the bench in the 73rd minute to a warm reception from Liverpool fans. On 21 April 2014, Fowler also featured in a charity match to commemorate the lives of the 96 Liverpool fans who died in the Hillsborough Disaster. Fowler scored both goals for his team in a 2–2 draw. and so officially announced his retirement. In May 2016, it was revealed that Fowler would return to the pitch to play for England in Soccer Aid, a charity football match in aid of UNICEF, alongside Jamie Carragher.

== International career ==
Fowler earned his first cap for England on 27 March 1996, coming on as a 76th-minute substitute in the 1–0 friendly win against Bulgaria at Wembley Stadium. On 24 April, he won his second cap and made his first start for England in the 0–0 draw with Croatia. Despite only having 3 caps to his name, England manager Terry Venables selected Fowler in his 22-man squad for Euro 1996. Fowler went on to make two substitute appearances in the tournament, featuring in the 4–1 win against the Netherlands in the final group game, and in the 0–0 draw against Spain in the quarter-finals, a game England won on penalties.

Fowler did not feature during England's qualifying campaign for the 1998 FIFA World Cup, mainly due to a serious knee ligament injury late in the 1997–98 season, and thus missed out on Glenn Hoddle's 22-man squad for the tournament. He did, however, manage to score his first goal for his country on 29 March 1997, netting the second goal in a 2–0 friendly win against Mexico at Wembley Stadium. A second goal followed in his next cap on 15 November, netting just before half-time in the 2–0 friendly win against Cameroon.

On 9 June 1999, Fowler played in his first competitive game for England in nearly three years, starting in the 1–1 draw with Bulgaria during Euro 2000 qualifying. Kevin Keegan named Fowler in the preliminary squad for Euro 2000, and after featuring in the three warm-up games against Brazil, Ukraine, and Malta, he was named in the final squad on 1 June 2000. Fowler did not play in the tournament as England were eliminated in the group stages.

Fowler scored his fourth goal for England on 25 May 2001, netting the second goal in the 4–0 friendly win against Mexico at Pride Park, Derby. On 5 September, he scored his first competitive goal for England in the 2–0 win against Albania at St James' Park, Newcastle. This was during qualifying for the 2002 FIFA World Cup. England qualified for the World Cup, and after scoring in friendlies against Italy and Cameroon, Fowler was selected in Sven-Göran Eriksson's 23-man squad for the tournament in South Korea and Japan. He didn't appear in any of England's group matches, but on 15 June 2002, he came on as a second-half substitute in the 3–0 win against Denmark in the Round of 16. This turned out to be Fowler's last cap for his country. He won a total of 26 caps for England and scored 7 goals.

== Managerial career ==
=== Muangthong United ===
On 1 October 2011, Fowler was appointed as the manager of Muangthong United, where he was already an existing player. Muangthong had taken action and sacked Henrique Calisto; a statement made by the club read, "The board have appointed Robbie Fowler as the acting head coach and have terminated the contract of Portuguese boss Henrique Calisto. The contract is until the end of the season and the team must adapt to long-term goals if it is to succeed in Asia", thus making Fowler player-manager.

In October 2013, it was announced that Fowler would be taking up a coaching role with Liverpool's academy.

=== Brisbane Roar ===
On 23 April 2019, it was announced by Australian A-League club Brisbane Roar that Fowler had signed a two-year contract to act as the club's new head coach ahead of the 2019–20 season. Tony Grant and Darren Davies joined his coaching staff, with Davies having acted as caretaker manager prior to Fowler's arrival. Brisbane announced a major clear-out during the off-season, where fourteen senior players were released, notably marquee player Éric Bauthéac. Fowler then made his first signing as a manager in June, when Roy O'Donovan signed from Newcastle United Jets.

Fowler's first competitive match was a 2–0 win over reigning champions Sydney FC on 7 August in the FFA Cup. Fowler won the league's Coach of the Month accolade for January and February 2020. With the league suspended in March due to the COVID-19 pandemic, he resigned on 29 June in order to be closer to his family.

=== East Bengal ===
On 9 October 2020, Indian Super League side East Bengal announced the signing of Fowler as their new manager. His side finished 9th in 2020–21, winning 3 of 20 games, and his two-year contract was ended by mutual consent on 8 September 2021.

In August 2022, Fowler was coaching at Oxford United "on a casual basis", according to manager Karl Robinson.

=== Al-Qadsiah ===
On 29 June 2023, Fowler was appointed as the manager of Saudi First Division League side Al-Qadsiah. Fowler left the club on 26 October after Al-Qadsiah terminated his contract, despite the team being unbeaten in the league with six wins and two draws. Míchel was announced as Fowler’s replacement on the same day. According to Fowler, the decision was influenced by the club’s desire to follow a more Spanish-style model under their sporting director.

== Style of play ==
"I’m not sure I've ever seen with my own eyes a striker that hits the ball so correctly, so pure. He just had everything you'd want in a finisher."

— Liverpool teammate Michael Owen on Fowler's finishing.

Renowned for his goal scoring, Fowler was considered a quick and opportunistic striker with sound technical ability. Although naturally left-footed, he possessed an accurate shot with both feet, and was also considered effective in the air. Despite his reputation as a "goal-poacher", he was also a creative forward, capable of linking up well with other players, and laying off the ball to other strikers. He was also known to be injury-prone throughout his career.

== Sponsorship ==
In his playing career, Fowler was sponsored by the sportswear company Nike, and appeared in Nike commercials. In 1997 he starred in Nike's "Park Life" commercial (set to the tune "Parklife" by Blur) where a group of amateur pub league players playing football at Hackney Marshes in east London are suddenly joined by top Premier League footballers, including Fowler, Eric Cantona and Ian Wright. In 2000, "Park Life" ranked number 15 in Channel 4's poll of the 100 Greatest TV Ads.

== Personal life ==
Fowler married wife Kerrie on 10 June 2001 in the town of Duns, Scottish Borders in Scotland. Together they have three daughters and one son. Their son, Jacob, signed a scholarship with Oxford United in August 2022, and as of August 2026 plays for Europa FC in Gibraltar. Fowler is a cousin of boxer and 2014 Commonwealth Games gold medallist Anthony Fowler. Two of Fowler's cousins died of drug abuse.

Fowler was referred to by The Observer in September 2005 as Britain's richest sportsman, with a £28 million fortune and nearly 100 properties. In 2020, he was an ambassador to a property scheme in Liverpool which led to tens of investors losing several hundreds of pounds. In association with long-term friend Steve McManaman, Fowler has invested in several racehorses through their company The Macca and Growler Partnership, most notably 2003 Queen Elizabeth the Queen Mother Celebration Chase runner-up Seebald. On 2 September 2005, Fowler released a book called Fowler: My Autobiography, about his time as a footballer and the issues surrounding him. He released a second book in November 2019 called Robbie Fowler: My Life In Football : Goals, Glory & The Lessons I've Learnt.

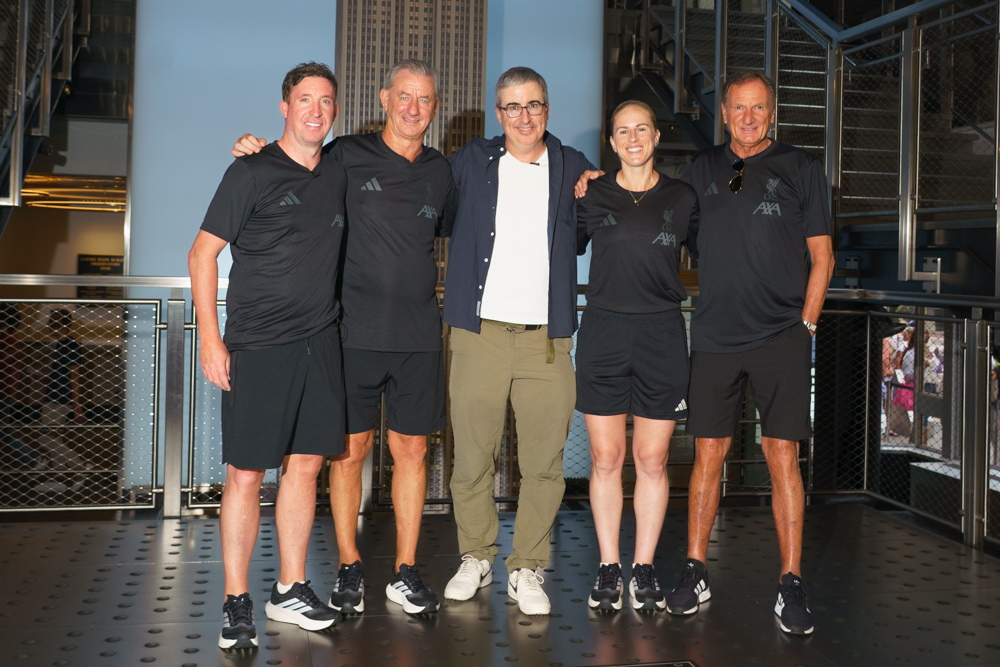
A club ambassador, Fowler (far left) with former Liverpool players Rush, Dowie and Thompson with comedian and Liverpool fan John Oliver (middle) in New York in July 2026

In June 2008, Fowler participated alongside McManaman in Steve Nash and Claudio Reyna's Showdown in Chinatown, an 8-on-8 charity football game at Sara D. Roosevelt Park in Manhattan with McManaman making five of the goals, including one for Fowler.

In 2019, Fowler featured in the first season of ITV show Harry's Heroes, which featured former football manager Harry Redknapp attempting get a squad of former England international footballers back fit and healthy for a game against Germany legends.

In 2021, Fowler competed in the Legends Tour Celebrity Series of golf tournaments for charity. He won the Celebrity Series event at Formby near his native Liverpool in 2021 and competed at the Celebrity Series Grand Final in Mauritius in 2022, finishing second and winning a total of £17,250 for charity over the 2021 season. He has previously held charity golf days to raise money for charities including The Ichthyosis Support Group. Fowler's godson suffers from the rare genetic skin condition ichthyosis, for which there is no cure.

In December 2025, Fowler revealed that he had basal-cell carcinoma, a form of skin cancer, removed from his face.

== Career statistics ==
=== Club ===
Club statistics
Club	Season	League			FA Cup		League Cup		Continental		Total	
Club	Season	Division	Apps	Goals	Apps	Goals	Apps	Goals	Apps	Goals	Apps	Goals
Liverpool	1993–94	Premier League	28	12	1	0	5	6	0	0	34	18
Liverpool	1994–95	Premier League	42	25	7	2	8	4	—		57	31
Liverpool	1995–96	Premier League	38	28	7	6	4	2	4 (Note: All appearance(s) in UEFA Cup)	0	53	36
Liverpool	1996–97	Premier League	32	18	1	1	4	5	7 (Note: All appearance(s) in UEFA Cup Winners' Cup)	7	44	31
Liverpool	1997–98	Premier League	20	9	1	0	4	3	3	1	28	13
Liverpool	1998–99	Premier League	25	14	2	1	2	1	6	2	35	18
Liverpool	1999–2000	Premier League	14	3	0	0	0	0	—		14	3
Liverpool	2000–01	Premier League	27	8	5	2	5	6	11	1	48	17
Liverpool	2001–02	Premier League	10	3	0	0	0	0	7 (Note: Six appearances and one goal in UEFA Champions League, one appearance in UEFA Super Cup)	1	17	4
Liverpool	Total		236	120	24	12	32	27	38	12	330	171
Leeds United	2001–02	Premier League	22	12	1	0	0	0	—		23	12
Leeds United	2002–03	Premier League	8	2	1	0	0	0	1	0	10	2
Leeds United	Total		30	14	2	0	0	0	1	0	33	14
Manchester City	2002–03	Premier League	13	2	0	0	0	0	—		13	2
Manchester City	2003–04	Premier League	31	7	4	1	2	1	4	1	41	10
Manchester City	2004–05	Premier League	32	11	0	0	1	1	—		33	12
Manchester City	2005–06	Premier League	4	1	1	3	0	0	—		5	4
Manchester City	Total		80	21	5	4	3	2	4	1	92	28
Liverpool	2005–06	Premier League	14	5	0	0	0	0	2 (Note: All appearance(s) in UEFA Champions League)	0	16	5
Liverpool	2006–07	Premier League	16	3	0	0	3	2	4	2	23	7
Liverpool	Total		30	8	0	0	3	2	6	2	39	12
Cardiff City	2007–08	Championship	13	4	0	0	3	2	—		16	6
Blackburn Rovers	2008–09	Premier League	3	0	0	0	3	0	—		6	0
North Queensland Fury	2009–10	A-League	26	9	0	0	—		—		26	9
Perth Glory	2010–11	A-League	28	9	0	0	—		—		28	9
Muangthong United	2011	Thai Premier League	13	8	4	2	1	0	2 (Note: All appearance(s) in AFC Champions League)	0	20	10
Career total			459	193	35	18	45	33	51	15	590	259

=== International ===
Appearances and goals by national team and year
National team	Year	Apps	Goals
England	1996	5	0
England	1997	2	2
England	1998	1	0
England	1999	3	0
England	2000	4	1
England	2001	7	2
England	2002	4	2
Total		26	7

England score listed first, score column indicates score after each Fowler's goal.

International goals by date, venue, cap, opponent, score, result and competition
No.	Date	Venue	Cap	Opponent	Score	Result	Competition
1	29 March 1997	Wembley Stadium, London, England	6	Mexico	2–0	2–0	Friendly
2	15 November 1997	Wembley Stadium, London, England	7	Cameroon	2–0	2–0	Friendly
3	31 May 2000	Wembley Stadium, London, England	13	Ukraine	1–0	2–0	Friendly
4	25 May 2001	Pride Park Stadium, Derby, England	17	Mexico	2–0	4–0	Friendly
5	5 September 2001	St James' Park, Newcastle upon Tyne, England	20	Albania	2–0	2–0	2002 FIFA World Cup qualification
6	27 March 2002	Elland Road, Leeds, England	23	Italy	1–0	1–2	Friendly
7	26 May 2002	Noevir Stadium Kobe, Kobe, Japan	25	Cameroon	2–2	2–2	Friendly

=== Managerial ===
As of 26 October 2023

Team		From	To	Record					Source
Team		From	To	G	W	D	L	Winning %	Source
(Thailand)	Muangthong United	1 October 2011	31 January 2012	15	10	2	3	66.67	
(Australia)	Brisbane Roar	23 April 2019	29 June 2020	23	11	5	7	47.83	
(India)	East Bengal	9 October 2020	8 September 2021	20	3	9	8	15.00	
(Saudi Arabia)	Al-Qadsiah	29 June 2023	26 October 2023	8	6	2	0	75.00	
Total				66	30	19	17	45.45	—

== Honours ==
Liverpool

- FA Cup: 2000–01; runner-up: 1995–96
- Football League Cup: 1994–95, 2000–01
- UEFA Cup: 2000–01
- UEFA Super Cup: 2001
- UEFA Champions League runner-up: 2006–07

England U18

- UEFA European U-18 Championship: 1993

England U21

- Toulon Tournament: 1994

Individual

- Premier League Player of the Month: December 1995, January 1996
- PFA Young Player of the Year: 1995, 1996
- FA Cup top scorer: 1995–96
- UEFA Cup Winners' Cup top scorer: 1996–97
- Ballon d'Or Nominated: 1996, 1997
- UEFA Fair Play Award: 1997
- EFL Cup top scorer: 2000–01
- Alan Hardaker Trophy: 2001
- North Queensland Fury Player of the Year: 2010
- North Queensland Fury Golden Boot: 2010
- North Queensland Fury Players' Player of the Year: 2010
- Perth Glory Golden Boot: 2011

== Bibliography ==
- Fowler, Robbie; Maddock, David (2005). Fowler: My Autobiography. London: Macmillan. ISBN 1-4050-5132-9.
- Fowler, Robbie (2019). Robbie Fowler: My Life In Football: Goals, Glory & The Lessons I've Learnt. London: Blink Publishing. ISBN 978-1788701105.
