= Ian Frodsham =

English footballer

Personal information
- Date of birth: 22 December 1975
- Place of birth: Liverpool, England
- Date of death: 2 January 1995 (aged 19)
- Position: Midfielder

Youth career
- 1987–1994: Liverpool

Senior career*
Years	Team	Apps	(Gls)
1994–1995	Liverpool	0	(0)

International career
1993	England U18	1	(0)
- * Club domestic league appearances and goals

Ian Timothy Frodsham (22 December 1975 – 2 January 1995) was an English footballer who was at Liverpool. He joined the club as an under-11, from Brookfield School in Kirkby. He signed his professional contract at 17, and played regularly with the Liverpool reserves, although he never played a competitive game for the first team.

He died in January 1995 at age 19 from a spinal tumour, which had been diagnosed the previous year.

Liverpool Football Academy's indoor arena is named the Ian Frodsham Indoor Arena, and the club's young player of the year award is named the Ian Frodsham Memorial Award. There is also an Ian Frodsham Tournament and Memorial Cup held at the Academy for school children in the Kirkby area.
