= Michael Stensgaard =

Danish footballer (born 1974)

Personal information
- Date of birth: 1 September 1974 (age 52)
- Place of birth: Copenhagen, Denmark
- Height: 6 ft 2 in (1.88 m)
- Position: Goalkeeper

Senior career*
Years	Team	Apps	(Gls)
1993–1994	Hvidovre		
1994–1996	Liverpool	0	(0)
1997–1998	Hvidovre	0	(0)
1998	Copenhagen	17	(0)
1998–1999	Southampton	0	(0)
1999–2001	Copenhagen	19	(0)

International career
1993–1994	Denmark U21	8	(0)
- * Club domestic league appearances and goals

Michael Stensgaard (born 1 September 1974) is a Danish former professional footballer who played as a goalkeeper.

He represented Danish clubs Hvidovre IF and FC Copenhagen, as well as Liverpool and Southampton in the Premier League. He played eight games for the Denmark U21 national team. After ending his footballing career in 2001 due to injuries, he studied Cand.jur. with a degree in business conflict mediation.

== Career ==
Stensgaard got his national breakthrough with Hvidovre IF, and was touted the successor of former Hvidovre and Danish international goalkeeper Peter Schmeichel. He made his Denmark national under-21 football team debut in October 1993. In May 1994, he was bought by English team Liverpool for a transfer fee of £400,000.

He arrived at Liverpool to succeed Bruce Grobbelaar as understudy to David James, and was issued the number 13 shirt during his time at the club. He became known for a bizarre injury which ended his chances of breaking into the Liverpool first team, as he dislocated his shoulder when setting up an ironing board soon after joining the club. The injury evolved into a recurring shoulder ailment requiring surgery, and he never played a first team game for the club. His lack of success in Liverpool later earned him a selection in the Liverpool Echo's Merseyside Lost 11, a selection of players which the newspaper considered the biggest fiascos in the history of Liverpool and local rivals Everton.

He was declared a footballing invalid in July 1996, aged 21, and his Liverpool contract was mutually terminated after more than a year on the sidelines. He returned to Denmark, and became the goalkeeping coach of Hvidovre IF, coaching later Liverpool goalkeeper Jørgen Nielsen. In May 1997, he requested his licence from Liverpool in order to become backup keeper for Hvidovre, but refused to play when given the opportunity, as he still feared for his shoulder. With medical help and Olympic medalist Arne Nielsson as his mental coach, Stensgaard then aimed to reignite his active career.

He signed a six-month deal with Danish Superliga club F.C. Copenhagen (FCK) in May 1998. He replaced injured keeper Karim Zaza, and kept his place in the FCK starting line-up for all 17 games in the first half of the 1998–99 Superliga season. When his contract expired in December 1998, he moved back to England to play for Southampton on a three-and-a-half-year contract. He spent his time at Southampton as the understudy of Welsh international Paul Jones, and after controversy with manager Dave Jones over missing playing time, he was relegated to third choice goalkeeper. He returned to FCK in July 1999. He played a further 19 games for FCK, but suffered a spinal disc herniation and terminated his career in July 2001, 26 years old.

== Personal life ==
After ending his footballing career, Stensgaard finished his cand.jur. education. He was the first in Scandinavia to specialize in business conflict mediation, and he was on the winning team in the 2004 International Negotiation Competition. He served as an International Negotiation Competition judge, and has lectured at the University of Copenhagen. He is also a FIFA-licensed football player agent, and acts as a mental coach for both athletes and businessmen.
