= Steve Harkness =

English footballer

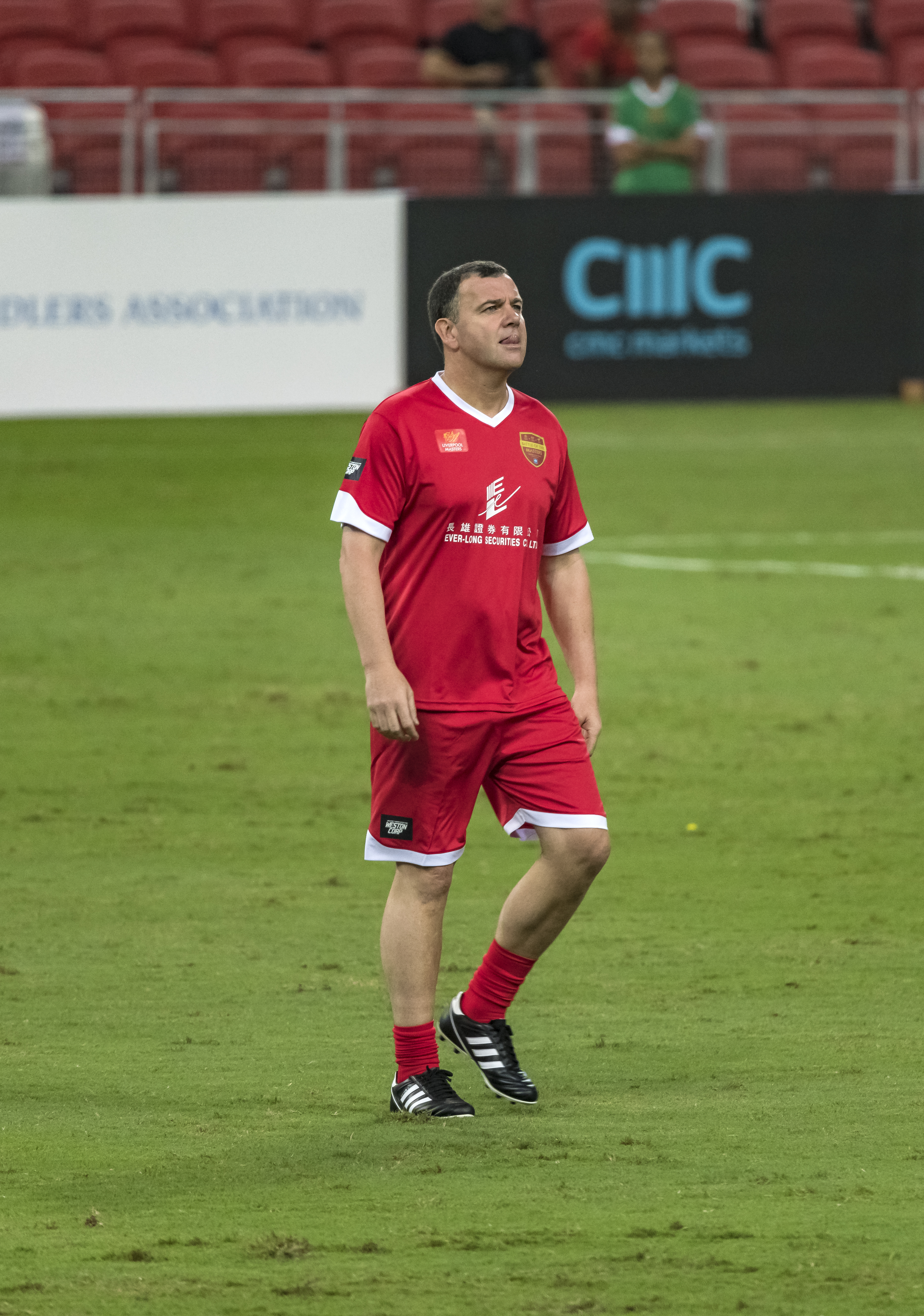
- Harkness playing in a friendly in 2017

Personal information
- Full name: Steven Harkness
- Date of birth: 27 August 1971 (age 55)
- Place of birth: Carlisle, Cumberland, England
- Height: 5 ft 10 in (1.78 m)
- Position: Left back

Senior career*
Years	Team	Apps	(Gls)
1989	Carlisle United	13	(0)
1989–1999	Liverpool	102	(3)
1993	→ Huddersfield Town (loan)	5	(0)
1995	→ Southend United (loan)	6	(0)
1999	Benfica	9	(0)
1999–2000	Blackburn Rovers	17	(0)
2000–2002	Sheffield Wednesday	30	(1)
2002	Chester City	10	(0)
Total		192	(4)

International career
- England Youth
- * Club domestic league appearances and goals

Steven Harkness (born 27 August 1971) is an English former professional footballer who played as a defender from 1989 to 2002.

Harkness notably played in the Premier League for Liverpool, where he spent a decade before later going on to play in Portugal with Benfica. He also played in the Football League with Carlisle United, Huddersfield Town, Southend United, Blackburn Rovers, Sheffield Wednesday and Chester City.

== Career ==
=== Carlisle United ===
A defender or midfielder, most comfortable at left-back but able to play in a range of positions, he began his career with his hometown club, Carlisle United, signing professional forms on 31 March 1989. After just 13 games for the Cumbrians he impressed sufficiently to be signed by Liverpool.

=== Liverpool ===
He joined under manager Kenny Dalglish on 17 July 1989 for £75,000. At this time Liverpool were still the dominant side in England as holders of the FA Cup and having not finished lower than champions or runners-up in the First Division since 1981.

However, Harkness did not walk straight into the first team at Anfield, as David Burrows was the club's first choice left-back. By the time Dalglish resigned on 22 February 1991, Harkness had been at Liverpool for 19 months but had still yet to make his competitive debut. Dalglish was succeeded by Graeme Souness as Liverpool manager and it was Souness who gave Harkness his Liverpool debut, two years after arriving, in the 1–0 league win over Queens Park Rangers at Anfield on 27 August 1991 – his 20th birthday. His first goal for the Reds did not come until the 29 April 1995 in the 2–1 league win against Norwich City, at Carrow Road. He was out of the side between December 1994 and mid-April 1995 meaning he missed the victorious 1995 Football League Cup Final.

Harkness suffered a broken leg in Liverpool's 1–0 league defeat at Coventry City on 6 April 1996 and was out of action for nearly a year afterwards. He missed the 1996 FA Cup Final, which Liverpool lost 1–0 to Manchester United, and also missed the bulk of the 1996–97 season, in which Liverpool frequently led the Premier League until being leapfrogged by Manchester United in late January and were ultimately unable to stop their north-west rivals from retaining the league title.

He made 140 appearances in his six years at the club. He was sent out on loan twice during his Anfield career, firstly to Huddersfield Town, where he played six times and also Southend United, where he, again, played six times. He remained at Anfield until 1999 but was one of the first victims of the Gérard Houllier revolution.

His period at Liverpool was marred by him becoming the first player to be reported to the FA for racist abuse. Stan Collymore alleged that during a 1998 match for Aston Villa against Liverpool, Harkness subjected him to a 10-minute barrage of insults pertaining to his mixed-race heritage. Harkness denied the allegations. Later that year in another match between the two teams, Collymore went in with a two-footed challenge on Harkness's standing leg in the ninth minute of the match, causing him to be substituted with injury.

=== Benfica and Blackburn Rovers ===
Harkness left Anfield to join up with old manager Graeme Souness at Benfica on 9 March 1999 for £750,000. He was one of several British players signed for the Lisbon club by Souness, and chose to wear only his first name on the back of his shirt there. He only lasted five months in Portugal, however, before Brian Kidd brought him to recently relegated Blackburn Rovers in August 1999. The fee was £400,000 with potential add-ons of £100,000.

He made his debut for Rovers on 6 November 1999 in the 2–2 league draw with Ipswich Town – the first game after Kidd was sacked and long-serving coach Tony Parkes put in charge – at Ewood Park. His former Liverpool and Benfica manager Souness was appointed as Blackburn's manager on 15 March 2000.

=== Sheffield Wednesday ===
After a disappointing year, which saw Blackburn finish mid-table in the First Division, he was allowed to join Sheffield Wednesday for £200,000 after just 21 appearances; just like Blackburn when Harkness had joined them a year earlier, Wednesday had just been relegated from the Premier League. His Owls debut came on 30 September 2000 in the 2–0 league defeat to Gillingham at the Priestfield Stadium.

His two years at Hillsborough were plagued by injury, however, and he only managed 32 appearances in that time, and scored once against Birmingham City. It was not a successful time for the Owls, who narrowly avoided relegation to Division Two in both of his seasons there and would go down the following year. Wednesday terminated his contract in May 2002.

=== Chester City ===
Harkness moved to Chester City on a free transfer on 11 July 2002, playing under former teammate Mark Wright. On 1 November that year, aged 31, having played just 10 times due to ankle injury, he ended his contract with the Conference Premier club by mutual consent.

== Personal life ==
In September 2019, Harkness admitted at Liverpool Magistrates' Court to driving while disqualified and uninsured. He was sentenced to a three-year driving ban, a nine-week jail term suspended for two years, and 100 hours of community service.
