= Jamie Redknapp =

English footballer (born 1973)

- Redknapp in 2026

Personal information
- Full name: Jamie Frank Redknapp
- Date of birth: 25 June 1973 (age 53)
- Place of birth: Barton on Sea, Hampshire, England
- Height: 6 ft 0 in (1.83 m)
- Position: Midfielder

Youth career
- Tottenham Hotspur
- –1990: AFC Bournemouth

Senior career*
Years	Team	Apps	(Gls)
1990–1991	AFC Bournemouth	13	(0)
1991–2002	Liverpool	237	(30)
2002–2005	Tottenham Hotspur	48	(4)
2005	Southampton	16	(0)
Total		314	(34)

International career
1993–1994	England U21	18	(5)
1994	England B	1	(0)
1995–1999	England	17	(1)
- * Club domestic league appearances and goals

Jamie Frank Redknapp (born 25 June 1973) is an English former professional footballer who was active from 1989 until 2005. He is a pundit at Sky Sports and an editorial sports columnist at the Daily Mail. A technically skillful and creative midfielder with an excellent range of passing, he was also an accurate and powerful free-kick taker. He is best known for his time at Liverpool where he spent 11 years and was the captain in his last three seasons.

Redknapp began his career at AFC Bournemouth before he moved to Liverpool aged 17 in 1991 having been signed by Kenny Dalglish. A key member of the Liverpool midfield throughout the 1990s, he played 237 league games for the club and won the 1995 Football League Cup final. Although out injured in 2001, as captain of the club he lifted the FA Cup having been asked to by his teammates. He moved to Tottenham Hotspur in 2002 before joining his last club Southampton in 2005. He also gained 17 England caps between 1995 and 1999, and was a member of England's squad that reached the semi-finals of Euro 1996 during which he excelled in the game against Scotland before his tournament ended with injury.

In a career that was blighted by a succession of injuries, Redknapp was as famous for his media profile off the field as much as on it. He married the pop singer Louise in 1998. Redknapp comes from a well-known footballing family. His father is the former football manager Harry Redknapp. He is also a cousin of Frank Lampard, and a nephew of Frank Lampard Sr.

== Club career ==
=== Summary ===
Redknapp was born in Barton on Sea, Hampshire and started his career by joining Tottenham Hotspur as a youth player but turned down their offer of a professional contract, deciding to play for AFC Bournemouth under his father, manager Harry Redknapp. He went on to play for Liverpool where Redknapp would be remembered for his best performances. After that Redknapp returned and played 2 1/2 seasons for Tottenham Hotspur then finally joined Southampton, where he played under his father for a second time. Redknapp was also capped 17 times by England, scoring one goal.

=== AFC Bournemouth ===
Redknapp started out on the road to professional football as a schoolboy at Tottenham Hotspur but began his professional career, at the age of 16, in 1989 at Bournemouth, then managed by his father, Harry. He made 13 appearances for the club before attracting the attention of Liverpool, who signed him on 15 January 1991. Kenny Dalglish had paid £350,000 for Redknapp, who was still only 17 at the time. He was one of the most expensively signed teenagers in English football around this time.

=== Liverpool ===
Redknapp was one of the last players to be signed by manager Kenny Dalglish before his surprising resignation on 22 February 1991 and later became the youngest Liverpool player to appear in European competition, at 18 years 120 days when making his Liverpool debut against Auxerre in the UEFA Cup on 23 October 1991, by which time Liverpool were being managed by Graeme Souness. This record was broken by Phil Charnock thirteen months later. Redknapp's first goal for Liverpool came in his league debut on 7 December 1991 when he featured as a 63rd-minute substitute for Jan Mølby in a 1–1 draw with Southampton at the Dell.

Having broken into the first-team picture, Redknapp racked up 136 games for Liverpool across 1992–93, 1993–94 and 1994–95, showing off his composure, passing prowess and long-range shooting ability.

— Official Liverpool F.C. profile of Redknapp.

Following Dalglish's departure, Redknapp was part of a transitional Liverpool team under Souness. At 18 he spent most of his first full season as a substitute or in the reserves, missing the 1992 FA Cup final triumph, before making 40 appearances for the club in the 1992–93 season and establishing himself as a member of the first team. At this time, Redknapp had also become one of the mass-marketed poster boys of the newly developing Premier League where, alongside other photogenic young players like Manchester United players Ryan Giggs and Lee Sharpe, he was used in commercials, advertising spots and for the league's promotional purposes in merchandising and sales, with the result being that football stars had become idols on par with rock stars and pop stars, by and around the mid to late 1990s.

Under the next Liverpool manager Roy Evans, Redknapp was part of a group of Liverpool players from the mid-1990s who were dubbed "The Spice Boys" by the press, which became used in a derogatory manner, implying that he and other stars including the talisman of the team Steve McManaman and striker Robbie Fowler were underachieving playboys. Rob Smyth in The Guardian recalls: "their young side, built around Redknapp, McManaman and Fowler, were perceived by most, including the England manager Terry Venables, to be more promising than [Manchester] United's youngsters", while on the day of their game against Manchester United at Old Trafford in October 1995 Paul Wilson in The Observer wrote: "Liverpool are looking ominously threatening again, with a young team which appears capable of greatness if Roy Evans can keep it together", adding "it may be possible to win the championship with kids like Fowler, McManaman and Redknapp."

On the final day of the 1994–95 season, Redknapp scored a late winner for Liverpool against league leaders Blackburn Rovers which was greeted by "near silence at Anfield", in a game that could have handed the league title to arch rivals Manchester United had they also won their game. While knowing the possible repercussions of a Liverpool win, Redknapp stated: "The only thing in our minds that afternoon, though, was winning the game. We're professionals and we want to win every game we play." Redknapp, who did not celebrate his goal either, reflected: "It was one of the strangest moments of my life on a football field", before Anfield erupted as it was confirmed that Manchester United could only draw at West Ham thus Blackburn had won the league. Two months earlier, Redknapp opened the scoring for Liverpool in their 2–0 win over Manchester United at Anfield.

In the four full seasons under Evans, Redknapp excelled in a midfield that won the 1995 Football League Cup final, were 1996 FA Cup final runners-up (a game where the Liverpool players wore the much criticised cream Armani suits), with league finishes of fourth, third, fourth and third, deemed as an underachievement with the talent in the team, while playing an open, attacking brand of football exemplified by their two 4–3 games against Newcastle at Anfield, the first of which ranking among the greatest games in Premier League history.

Redknapp's contributions peaked during the 1998–99 season as he created numerous chances and scored 10 goals under new boss Gérard Houllier. Redknapp became vice- and then full club captain by 1999–2000 following the departures of John Barnes, Steve McManaman and Paul Ince. His contributions helped the club back into the top three of the Premier League but a knee injury curtailed his involvement in the 2000–01 season and in a bid to cure long-standing injury troubles he underwent knee surgery under renowned knee specialist Dr Richard Steadman in the US. As a result, Redknapp was unable to participate in the whole of the club's cup treble campaign which yielded the FA Cup, League Cup and UEFA Cup. Although injured, as the club captain he was called up by his teammates to receive the FA Cup with vice-captain Robbie Fowler at the Millennium Stadium in Cardiff. He made his comeback from injury during the pre-season tour before the 2001–02 season.

Redknapp's return did not last long as he was again struck by injury. On 27 October 2001 he played and scored in a 2–0 win over Charlton Athletic at The Valley, and then 3 days later he played what would prove to be his last game for the Merseyside club against Borussia Dortmund in the Champions League. He had played 308 times for the Reds and scored 41 goals, becoming a favourite amongst Liverpool fans, who included him at number 40 in the 2006 poll 100 Players Who Shook The Kop.

=== Tottenham Hotspur ===
Redknapp was allowed to join Glenn Hoddle's Tottenham Hotspur on a free transfer on 18 April 2002 with just a couple of fixtures remaining of the 2001–02 season. He made his debut at the beginning of the following campaign when he played on 17 August 2002 in the 2–2 league draw with his former club Liverpool's rival Everton at Goodison Park. Redknapp's pass into the path of Matthew Etherington allowed Etherington to score his first Premier League goal.

Redknapp scored his first goal for the club a week later on 26 August 2002 in the 1–0 league win over Aston Villa at White Hart Lane. Redknapp played 49 times for Spurs scoring 4 goals in his 2 1/2 years with the club before becoming his father Harry's first signing for Southampton on 4 January 2005.

=== Southampton ===
Redknapp joined Southampton's fight against relegation on a free transfer and made his debut on 5 January 2005 in a 3–3 league draw with Fulham at St Mary's. Redknapp's only goal for the club came three days later in the 3–1 FA Cup 3rd round victory over Northampton Town at Sixfields Stadium.

Redknapp was rarely fully fit during his brief spell at the Saints and was not able to prevent them from being relegated to the Championship after 27 successive seasons of top flight football.

At the end of the season, on 19 June 2005, Redknapp decided to retire from the game at the age of 31, due to his constant injury problems and on the advice of his medical specialists.

== International career ==
England manager Terry Venables gave Redknapp his international debut on 6 September 1995 in the 0–0 international friendly with Colombia at Wembley. The game is best remembered for his mishit cross that produced René Higuita's famous 'scorpion kick'. It ranked 94th in Channel 4's 100 Greatest Sporting Moments in 2002.

Redknapp was capped 17 times for England but played just 39 minutes at a major tournament, which was during the Euro 96 campaign when he appeared as a substitute against Scotland in the group stage. Rob Smyth later wrote in The Guardian that Redknapp's "slick passing greased some slow-moving wheels". Injury ruled him out of contention for both the 1998 FIFA World Cup and UEFA Euro 2000.

His only international goal came on 10 October 1999 in the 2–1 friendly victory against Belgium at the Stadium of Light, Sunderland.

== Coaching ==
On 21 September 2007, Chelsea reportedly approached Redknapp to become Avram Grant's assistant, as Chelsea's owner billionaire Roman Abramovich looked to shake up Stamford Bridge's coaching staff, though no appointment was forthcoming.

On 11 December 2008, it was announced Jamie Redknapp would become coach of Chelsea reserves two days a week whilst studying for his UEFA coaching badges. The vacancy arose after former Chelsea reserves coach Brendan Rodgers was hired by Championship outfit Watford.

== Media career ==
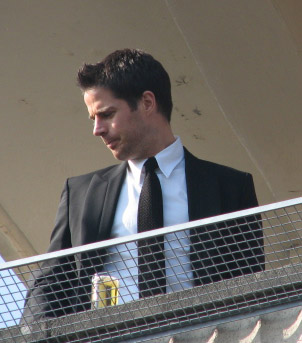
Redknapp in 2006

Redknapp began his career in 2002 as a studio-based pundit on BBC during the World Cup in 2002. He also was a BBC pundit during the 2004 European Championships. Since retiring he had gone into punditry full-time and is a regular studio pundit on Sky Sports alongside former England teammate Gary Neville. He is also a regular columnist on the Sky Sports website.

In 2005, Redknapp launched a bi-monthly magazine with his wife Louise and former teammate Tim Sherwood named Icon Magazine, aimed at professional footballers and their families.

In 2010, he was made host and mentor on the Sky1 show Football's Next Star, and a team captain in the Sky1 sports game show A League of Their Own.

Redknapp has received significant attention for his repeated overuse and misuse of the word "literally", in quotes such as "he literally chopped him in half in that challenge", "Alonso and Sissoko have been picked to literally sit in front of the back four", "Drogba literally destroyed Senderos today", "in his youth, Michael Owen was literally a greyhound", "he had to cut back inside onto his left, because he literally hasn't got a right foot", "Martin Jol's head is literally on the chopping block" and "these balls now – they literally explode off your feet". In 2010, he was presented with the Foot in Mouth Award from the Plain English Campaign for his poor use of English.

On 22 April 2021, chat show Redknapp's Big Night Out premiered on Sky One, presented by Jamie and Harry Redknapp with comedian Tom Davis.

== Personal life ==
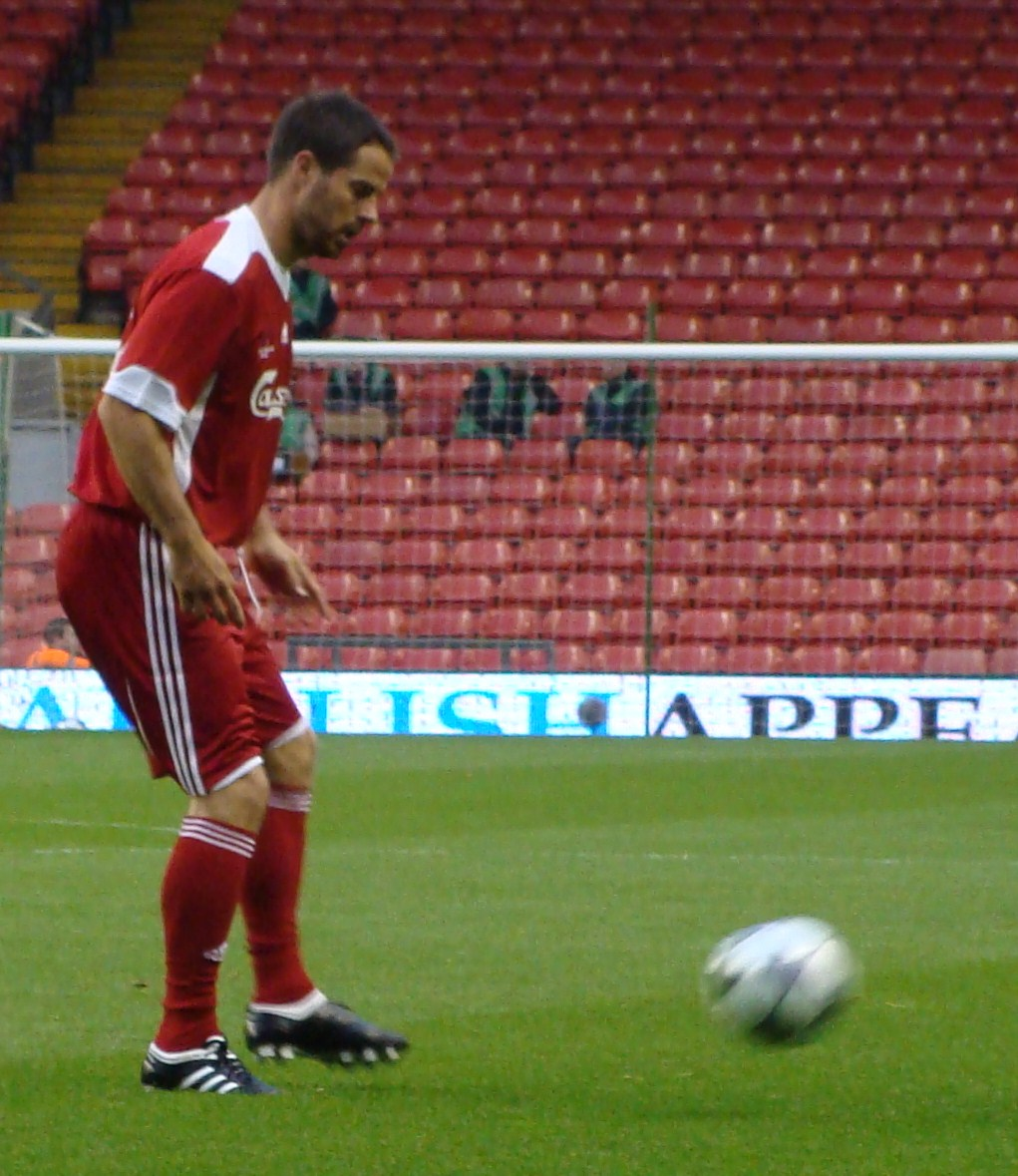
Redknapp at Anfield during the Hillsborough Memorial Match (2009)

Redknapp's father is football manager Harry Redknapp, and his mother is Sandra Harris. He has one older brother, who is a model. Redknapp is the maternal cousin of Frank Lampard, whose father is former West Ham United player and Harry's former managerial assistant Frank Lampard Sr.

Redknapp grew up on the south coast as his father was coaching Bournemouth at that time. He attended Twynham School in Christchurch and started playing in the Sunday league youth teams with his brother.

On 29 June 1998, Redknapp married pop singer Louise Nurding. They have two sons. After 19 years of marriage, Jamie and Louise Redknapp were granted a divorce on 29 December 2017.

On 18 October 2021, Redknapp married model Frida Andersson, at Chelsea Register Office in London. The couple have one son.

== Career statistics ==
=== Club ===
Appearances and goals by club, season and competition
Club	Season	League			FA Cup		League Cup		Europe		Other		Total	
Club	Season	Division	Apps	Goals	Apps	Goals	Apps	Goals	Apps	Goals	Apps	Goals	Apps	Goals
AFC Bournemouth	1989–90	Second Division	4	0	0	0	0	0	—		0	0	4	0
AFC Bournemouth	1990–91	Third Division	9	0	3	0	3	0	—		2 (Note: Appearances in Associate Members Cup)	0	17	0
AFC Bournemouth	Total		13	0	3	0	3	0	—		2	0	21	0
Liverpool	1991–92	First Division	6	1	2	0	0	0	2 (Note: Appearances in UEFA Cup)	0	—		10	1
Liverpool	1992–93	Premier League	29	2	1	0	6	1	4 (Note: Appearances in UEFA Cup Winners' Cup)	0	—		40	3
Liverpool	1993–94	Premier League	35	4	2	0	4	0	—		—		41	4
Liverpool	1994–95	Premier League	41	3	6	1	8	2	—		—		55	6
Liverpool	1995–96	Premier League	23	3	3	0	3	0	4	1	—		33	4
Liverpool	1996–97	Premier League	23	2	1	0	1	1	7	0	—		32	3
Liverpool	1997–98	Premier League	20	3	1	1	3	1	2	0	—		26	5
Liverpool	1998–99	Premier League	34	8	2	0	0	0	4	2	—		40	10
Liverpool	1999–2000	Premier League	22	3	0	0	1	0	—		—		23	3
Liverpool	2000–01	Premier League	0	0	0	0	0	0	0	0	—		0	0
Liverpool	2001–02	Premier League	4	1	0	0	1	0	3 (Note: Appearances in UEFA Champions League)	1	0	0	8	2
Liverpool	Total		237	30	18	2	27	5	26	4	0	0	308	41
Tottenham Hotspur	2002–03	Premier League	17	3	0	0	0	0	—		—		17	3
Tottenham Hotspur	2003–04	Premier League	17	1	0	0	0	0	—		—		17	1
Tottenham Hotspur	2004–05	Premier League	14	0	—		1	0	—		—		15	0
Tottenham Hotspur	Total		48	4	0	0	1	0	—		—		49	4
Southampton	2004–05	Premier League	16	0	1	1	—		—		—		17	1
Career total			314	34	22	3	31	5	26	4	2	0	395	46

=== International ===
Appearances and goals by national team and year
National team	Year	Apps	Goals
England	1995	3	0
England	1996	2	0
England	1997	3	0
England	1998	2	0
England	1999	7	1
Total		17	1

Scores and results list England's goal tally first, score column indicates score after each Redknapp goal.

List of international goals scored by Jamie Redknapp
No.	Date	Venue	Cap	Opponent	Score	Result	Competition
1	10 October 1999	Stadium of Light, Sunderland, England	15	Belgium	2–1	2–1	Friendly

== Honours ==
Liverpool

- Football League Cup: 1994–95
- FA Charity Shield: 2001
- UEFA Cup: 2000–01
- UEFA Super Cup: 2001
- FA Cup runner-up: 1995–96

England U21

- Toulon Tournament: 1993, 1994
