= 2002–03 Leicester City F.C. season =

2002–03 season of Leicester City

Leicester City
2002–03 season
- Chairman: Martin George
- Manager: Micky Adams
- Stadium: Walkers Stadium
- First Division: 2nd (promoted)
- FA Cup: Fourth round
- League Cup: Third round
- Top goalscorer: League: Paul Dickov (17); All: Paul Dickov (20)
- Highest home attendance: 32,082 (vs. Wolverhampton Wanderers, 28 September 2002)
- Lowest home attendance: 22,978 (vs. Reading, 24 August 2002)
- Average home league attendance: 29,230
Home colours	Away colours

During the 2002–03 English football season, Leicester City F.C. competed in the Football League First Division after being relegated from the FA Premier League the previous season. Despite being placed into administration, Leicester managed to regain promotion to the Premier League.

== Season summary ==
In October 2002, Leicester went into administration with debts of £30 million. Some of the reasons were the loss of TV money (ITV Digital, itself in administration, had promised money to First Division clubs for TV rights), the large wage bill, lower fees for players transferred to other clubs than expected and the £37 million cost of the new stadium. Manager Micky Adams was banned from the transfer market for most of the season, until the club was rescued by a takeover by a consortium led by former Leicester striker Gary Lineker. Adams guided Leicester to runners-up spot in Division One and automatic promotion back to the Premiership with 92 points. After several First Division clubs complained to the Football League, the Football League introduced a ruling that any club placed in administration would be deducted ten points.

== Final league table ==
Pos	Team	Pld	W	D	L	GF	GA	GD	Pts	Promotion or relegation
1	Portsmouth (C, P)	46	29	11	6	97	45	+52	98	Promotion to 2003–04 FA Premier League
2	Leicester City (P)	46	26	14	6	73	40	+33	92	Promotion to 2003–04 FA Premier League
3	Sheffield United	46	23	11	12	72	52	+20	80	Qualification for First Division Playoffs
4	Reading	46	25	4	17	61	46	+15	79	Qualification for First Division Playoffs
5	Wolverhampton Wanderers (O, P)	46	20	16	10	81	44	+37	76	Qualification for First Division Playoffs

Updated to match(es) played on 11 May 2003. Source: Soccerway
Rules for classification: 1) points; 2) goal difference; 3) number of goals scored.
(C) Champions; (O) Play-off winners; (P) Promoted

Results summary

Overall								Home						Away					
Pld	W	D	L	GF	GA	GD	Pts	W	D	L	GF	GA	GD	W	D	L	GF	GA	GD
46	26	14	6	73	40	+33	92	16	5	2	40	12	+28	10	9	4	33	28	+5

Source: 2002-03 Football League First Division table

Results by round

Round	1	2	3	4	5	6	7	8	9	10	11	12	13	14	15	16	17	18	19	20	21	22	23	24	25	26	27	28	29	30	31	32	33	34	35	36	37	38	39	40	41	42	43	44	45	46
Ground	H	A	A	H	A	H	A	H	H	A	H	A	H	A	H	A	H	A	H	A	A	H	H	A	H	A	H	A	A	H	A	H	H	A	A	H	H	A	A	H	H	A	H	A	H	A
Result	W	W	L	W	D	W	W	W	W	D	W	D	L	D	W	W	W	D	W	L	W	D	W	W	L	W	D	L	W	W	W	D	W	D	D	D	W	W	W	W	W	D	W	L	D	D
Position	5	1	8	6	7	3	2	2	2	2	2	2	3	3	2	2	2	2	2	2	2	2	2	2	2	2	2	2	2	2	2	2	2	2	2	2	2	2	2	2	2	1	1	2	2	2

Source: 11v11.com: 2002-03 Leicester City results
A = Away; H = Home; W = Win; D = Draw; L = Loss

== Results ==
Leicester City's score comes first

=== Legend ===
Win	Draw	Loss

=== Football League First Division ===
Date	Opponent	Venue	Result	Attendance	Scorers
10 August 2002	Watford	H	2–0	31,022	Deane (2)
14 August 2002	Stoke City	A	1–0	14,028	Scowcroft
18 August 2002	Ipswich Town	A	1–6	27,374	Stevenson
24 August 2002	Reading	H	2–1	22,978	Deane, Dickov (pen)
27 August 2002	Crystal Palace	A	0–0	15,440	
31 August 2002	Gillingham	H	2–0	30,067	Lewis, Dickov
7 September 2002	Wimbledon	A	3–2	2,165	Benjamin, Izzet (pen), Stewart
14 September 2002	Derby County	H	3–1	31,049	Izzet, Deane, Dickov
17 September 2002	Bradford City	H	4–0	24,651	Deane, Elliott, Dickov (pen), Scowcroft
21 September 2002	Sheffield Wednesday	A	0–0	22,219	
28 September 2002	Wolverhampton Wanderers	H	1–0	32,082	Dickov (pen)
5 October 2002	Norwich City	A	0–0	20,952	
19 October 2002	Burnley	H	0–1	26,254	
26 October 2002	Nottingham Forest	A	2–2	29,497	Deane, Dickov
29 October 2002	Coventry City	H	2–1	27,139	Taggart, Deane
2 November 2002	Portsmouth	A	2–0	19,107	Scowcroft, Elliott
9 November 2002	Walsall	H	2–0	25,243	Heath, Scowcroft
16 November 2002	Millwall	A	2–2	10,772	Heath, Stewart
23 November 2002	Rotherham United	H	2–1	31,714	Dickov, Stewart
26 November 2002	Preston North End	A	0–2	13,048	
30 November 2002	Grimsby Town	A	2–1	7,310	Scowcroft, Izzet
7 December 2002	Sheffield United	H	0–0	26,718	
14 December 2002	Millwall	H	4–1	31,904	Scowcroft (2), Elliott, Dickov
20 December 2002	Brighton & Hove Albion	A	1–0	6,592	Deane
26 December 2002	Ipswich Town	H	1–2	31,426	Dickov (pen)
28 December 2002	Watford	A	2–1	16,017	Elliott, Deane
11 January 2003	Stoke City	H	0–0	25,038	
18 January 2003	Gillingham	A	2–3	8,609	Sinclair, Wright
28 January 2003	Reading	A	3–1	17,156	Dickov (2, 1 pen), Heath
1 February 2003	Crystal Palace	H	1–0	27,005	Dickov
8 February 2003	Walsall	A	4–1	8,741	Dickov, Scowcroft (2), Elliott
17 February 2003	Portsmouth	H	1–1	31,775	Benjamin
22 February 2003	Wimbledon	H	4–0	31,438	Dickov (3, 2 pens), Benjamin
1 March 2003	Derby County	A	1–1	24,307	Deane
4 March 2003	Bradford City	A	0–0	11,531	
8 March 2003	Sheffield Wednesday	H	1–1	27,463	McLaren (own goal)
15 March 2003	Preston North End	H	2–1	30,713	Deane (2)
18 March 2003	Burnley	A	2–1	14,554	Dickov, Benjamin
22 March 2003	Coventry City	A	2–1	16,610	McKinlay, Scowcroft
5 April 2003	Grimsby Town	H	2–0	31,014	Benjamin, Davidson
8 April 2003	Nottingham Forest	H	1–0	32,065	Wright
12 April 2003	Rotherham United	A	1–1	9,888	Benjamin
19 April 2003	Brighton & Hove Albion	H	2–0	31,909	Izzet, Stewart
21 April 2003	Sheffield United	A	1–2	21,277	Deane
27 April 2003	Norwich City	H	1–1	31,639	Benjamin
4 May 2003	Wolverhampton Wanderers	A	1–1	28,190	Benjamin (pen)

=== FA Cup ===
Round	Date	Opponent	Venue	Result	Attendance	Goalscorers
R3	4 January 2003	Bristol City	H	2–0	25,868	Elliott, Dickov
R4	25 January 2003	Wolverhampton Wanderers	A	1–4	28,164	Dickov (pen)

=== League Cup ===
Round	Date	Opponent	Venue	Result	Attendance	Goalscorers
R1	10 September 2002	Hull City	A	4–2 (a.e.t.)	7,061	Rogers (2), Dickov, Scowcroft
R2	2 October 2002	Sheffield Wednesday	A	2–1 (a.e.t.)	10,472	Izzet, Benjamin
R3	5 November 2002	Manchester United	A	0–2	47,848	

== Squad ==
Note: Flags indicate national team as defined under FIFA eligibility rules; some limited exceptions apply. Players may hold more than one non-FIFA nationality.

No.	Pos.	Nation	Player
1	GK	ENG	Tim Flowers
2	DF	ENG	Andy Impey
3	DF	JAM	Frank Sinclair
4	DF	NIR	Gerry Taggart
6	MF	TUR	Muzzy Izzet
7	MF	WAL	Matt Jones
10	FW	ENG	James Scowcroft
12	GK	ENG	Simon Royce
13	GK	ENG	Michael Price
14	DF	SCO	Callum Davidson
15	DF	ENG	Alan Rogers
16	GK	ENG	Ian Walker
17	MF	ENG	Stefan Oakes
18	DF	SCO	Matt Elliott (captain)
19	GK	IRL	Paul Murphy

No.	Pos.	Nation	Player
20	FW	JAM	Trevor Benjamin
21	MF	ENG	Martin Reeves
22	FW	SCO	Paul Dickov
23	DF	ENG	Jordan Stewart
24	DF	ENG	Matt Heath
25	MF	ENG	Jon Stevenson
26	DF	ENG	Junior Lewis
27	FW	ENG	Brian Deane
28	DF	ENG	Jon Ashton
29	FW	ENG	Chris O'Grady
30	FW	FIN	Tomi Petrescu
32	MF	SCO	Billy McKinlay
33	MF	ENG	Nicky Summerbee
34	MF	ENG	Tom Williamson
35	FW	ENG	Tommy Wright

=== Left club during season ===
Note: Flags indicate national team as defined under FIFA eligibility rules; some limited exceptions apply. Players may hold more than one non-FIFA nationality.

No.	Pos.	Nation	Player
8	MF	ENG	Lee Marshall (to West Bromwich Albion)
9	FW	ENG	Darren Eadie (retired)
11	MF	ENG	Dennis Wise (to Millwall)

No.	Pos.	Nation	Player
29	FW	ENG	Matt Piper (to Sunderland)
31	MF	IRL	Damien Delaney (to Hull City)
—	DF	DEN	Jacob Laursen (released)

== Transfers ==
=== In ===
Date	Pos	Name	From	Fee
8 August 2002	MF	(England) Nicky Summerbee	Nottingham Forest	Free transfer
8 August 2002	MF	(Scotland) Billy McKinlay	Clydebank	Free transfer

=== Out ===
Date	Pos	Name	To	Fee
30 July 2002	FW	(Iceland) Arnar Gunnlaugsson	Dundee United	Free transfer
14 August 2002	MF	(England) Lee Marshall	West Bromwich Albion	£700,000
21 August 2002	FW	(England) Matt Piper	Sunderland	£3,500,000
24 September 2002	MF	(England) Dennis Wise	Millwall	Free transfer
16 October 2002	FW	(Republic of Ireland) Damien Delaney	Hull City	£50,000

Transfers in: ▼£0
Transfers out: ▲£4,250,000
Total spending: ▲£4,250,000
