= 2003–04 Leicester City F.C. season =

2003–04 season of Leicester City

Leicester City
2003–04 season
- Chairman: Jim McCahill
- Manager: Micky Adams
- Stadium: Walkers Stadium
- Premier League: 18th (relegated)
- FA Cup: Third round
- League Cup: Third round
- Top goalscorer: League: Les Ferdinand (12); All: Les Ferdinand; Paul Dickov (13 each)
- Highest home attendance: 32,148 (vs. Newcastle United, 26 December)
- Lowest home attendance: 18,916 (vs. Manchester City, 14 January)
- Average home league attendance: 30,983
Home colours	Away colours

During the 2003–04 English football season, Leicester City competed in the FA Premier League.

== Season summary ==
Micky Adams had guided Leicester back to the Premiership at the first attempt, despite the club spending part of their Division One campaign in receivership before a takeover safeguarded their future. But he was unable to keep them there, and their relegation was confirmed at the beginning of May. A 4–0 thumping of fellow relegation rivals Leeds United in September appeared to have set the tone for the rest of the season but it was soon followed by a setback of five straight defeats despite promising displays. A run of three wins in five games in November kept Leicester in close contention of survival, with the 2–0 victory at Portsmouth seeing them rise to as high as 12th; however, it all went wrong as, after a creditable 1–1 draw with eventual champions Arsenal, the team went into freefall and endured a dreadful run of only one win in 22 games (though most scorelines were reasonably close and they dropped too many points from 12 games they drew which they could have won). Ultimately, Leicester were relegated in a 2–2 draw at Charlton Athletic, which left them eight points adrift of Manchester City with two games remaining. It was a traumatic end to a season which had seen the club plagued with crises on and off the field, including the La Manga controversy when players Keith Gillespie, Frank Sinclair and Paul Dickov were accused of sexual assault following an alleged incident at a hotel in Spain (all charges were finally dropped).

== Final league table ==
Pos	Team	Pld	W	D	L	GF	GA	GD	Pts	Qualification or relegation
16	Manchester City	38	9	14	15	55	54	+1	41	
17	Everton	38	9	12	17	45	57	−12	39	
18	Leicester City (R)	38	6	15	17	48	65	−17	33	Relegation to the Football League Championship
19	Leeds United (R)	38	8	9	21	40	79	−39	33	Relegation to the Football League Championship
20	Wolverhampton Wanderers (R)	38	7	12	19	38	77	−39	33	Relegation to the Football League Championship

Source: Premier League
Rules for classification: 1) points; 2) goal difference; 3) number of goals scored.
(R) Relegated

Results summary

Overall								Home						Away					
Pld	W	D	L	GF	GA	GD	Pts	W	D	L	GF	GA	GD	W	D	L	GF	GA	GD
38	6	15	17	48	65	−17	33	3	10	6	19	28	−9	3	5	11	29	37	−8

Source: 2003-04 FA Premier League table

Results by round

Round	1	2	3	4	5	6	7	8	9	10	11	12	13	14	15	16	17	18	19	20	21	22	23	24	25	26	27	28	29	30	31	32	33	34	35	36	37	38
Ground	H	A	H	A	H	A	H	A	H	A	H	A	H	A	H	H	A	H	A	A	H	A	H	A	H	A	H	A	H	H	A	H	A	A	H	A	H	A
Result	D	L	D	L	W	L	L	L	L	L	W	W	D	W	D	L	L	D	D	D	L	D	L	L	D	D	D	W	D	D	L	L	L	L	D	D	W	L
Position	7	13	13	16	11	13	15	19	20	20	18	15	15	12	15	16	17	18	17	17	18	18	18	18	18	19	19	17	17	18	18	19	19	19	19	20	18	18

Source: 11v11.com: 2003–04 Leicester City results
A = Away; H = Home; W = Win; D = Draw; L = Loss

== Results ==
Leicester City's score comes first

=== Legend ===
Win	Draw	Loss

=== FA Premier League ===
Date	Opponent	Venue	Result	Attendance	Scorers
16 August 2003	Southampton	H	2–2	31,611	Dickov (pen), Ferdinand
23 August 2003	Chelsea	A	1–2	41,073	Scowcroft
26 August 2003	Middlesbrough	H	0–0	30,823	
30 August 2003	Aston Villa	A	1–3	32,274	Izzet
15 September 2003	Leeds United	H	4–0	30,460	Nalis, Dickov (2), Scowcroft
20 September 2003	Liverpool	A	1–2	44,094	Bent
27 September 2003	Manchester United	H	1–4	32,044	Sinclair
4 October 2003	Fulham	A	0–2	14,562	
19 October 2003	Tottenham Hotspur	H	1–2	31,521	Dickov
25 October 2003	Wolverhampton Wanderers	A	3–4	28,578	Ferdinand (2), Scimeca
2 November 2003	Blackburn Rovers	H	2–0	30,975	Bent, Howey
9 November 2003	Manchester City	A	3–0	46,966	Stewart, Dickov (pen), Bent
22 November 2003	Charlton Athletic	H	1–1	30,242	Ferdinand
29 November 2003	Portsmouth	A	2–0	20,061	Ferdinand, Bent
6 December 2003	Arsenal	H	1–1	32,108	Hignett
13 December 2003	Birmingham City	H	0–2	30,639	
20 December 2003	Everton	A	2–3	37,007	Ferdinand, Scowcroft
26 December 2003	Newcastle United	H	1–1	32,148	Dickov
28 December 2003	Bolton Wanderers	A	2–2	28,353	Bent, Ferdinand
7 January 2004	Southampton	A	0–0	31,053	
11 January 2004	Chelsea	H	0–4	31,547	
17 January 2004	Middlesbrough	A	3–3	27,125	Dickov (2), Bent
31 January 2004	Aston Villa	H	0–5	31,056	
7 February 2004	Newcastle United	A	1–3	52,125	Ferdinand
10 February 2004	Bolton Wanderers	H	1–1	26,674	Ferdinand
22 February 2004	Tottenham Hotspur	A	4–4	35,218	Doherty (own goal), Ferdinand, Thatcher, Bent
28 February 2004	Wolverhampton Wanderers	H	0–0	31,768	
13 March 2004	Birmingham City	A	1–0	29,491	Ferdinand
20 March 2004	Everton	H	1–1	31,650	Bent
28 March 2004	Liverpool	H	0–0	32,013	
5 April 2004	Leeds United	A	2–3	34,036	Dickov, Izzet
10 April 2004	Fulham	H	0–2	28,392	
13 April 2004	Manchester United	A	0–1	67,749	
17 April 2004	Blackburn Rovers	A	0–1	22,749	
24 April 2004	Manchester City	H	1–1	31,457	Scowcroft
1 May 2004	Charlton Athletic	A	2–2	26,034	Bent, Ferdinand
8 May 2004	Portsmouth	H	3–1	31,536	Dickov, Scowcroft, Taylor (own goal)
15 May 2004	Arsenal	A	1–2	38,419	Dickov

=== FA Cup ===
Round	Date	Opponent	Venue	Result	Attendance	Goalscorers
R3	3 January 2004	Manchester City	A	2–2	30,617	Dickov, Bent
R3R	14 January 2004	Manchester City	H	1–3	18,916	Ferdinand

=== League Cup ===
Round	Date	Opponent	Venue	Result	Attendance	Goalscorers
R2	23 September 2003	Crewe Alexandra	H	1–0	27,675	Dickov (pen)
R3	29 October 2003	Aston Villa	A	0–1	26,729	

== Squad ==
Squad at end of season

Note: Flags indicate national team as defined under FIFA eligibility rules; some limited exceptions apply. Players may hold more than one non-FIFA nationality.

No.	Pos.	Nation	Player
1	GK	ENG	Ian Walker
2	DF	ENG	Andrew Impey
3	DF	JAM	Frank Sinclair
5	MF	ENG	Craig Hignett
6	MF	TUR	Muzzy Izzet
7	MF	NIR	Keith Gillespie
8	MF	FRA	Lilian Nalis
9	FW	ENG	Les Ferdinand
10	FW	ENG	James Scowcroft
11	MF	ENG	Jordan Stewart
12	MF	ENG	Paul Brooker
13	MF	GER	Steffen Freund (on loan from 1. FC Kaiserslautern)
14	DF	SCO	Callum Davidson
15	DF	ENG	Alan Rogers

No.	Pos.	Nation	Player
16	GK	WAL	Danny Coyne
18	DF	SCO	Matt Elliott
20	FW	JAM	Trevor Benjamin
21	DF	ENG	Riccardo Scimeca
22	FW	SCO	Paul Dickov
25	DF	ENG	Matt Heath
27	MF	ENG	Steve Guppy
28	MF	SCO	Peter Canero
32	MF	SCO	Billy McKinlay
33	DF	WAL	Ben Thatcher
34	DF	FRA	Nicolas Priet
38	FW	ENG	Marcus Bent (on loan from Ipswich Town)
44	DF	GRE	Nikos Dabizas

=== Left club during the season ===
Note: Flags indicate national team as defined under FIFA eligibility rules; some limited exceptions apply. Players may hold more than one non-FIFA nationality.

No.	Pos.	Nation	Player
4	DF	NIR	Gerry Taggart (to Stoke City)
24	DF	ENG	Steve Howey (to Bolton Wanderers)
27	FW	ENG	Brian Deane (to West Ham United)

No.	Pos.	Nation	Player
28	MF	ENG	Jon Ashton (to Oxford United)
29	DF	ENG	John Curtis (to Portsmouth)
—	MF	ENG	Nicky Summerbee (to Bradford City)

== Reserve squad ==
Note: Flags indicate national team as defined under FIFA eligibility rules; some limited exceptions apply. Players may hold more than one non-FIFA nationality.

No.	Pos.	Nation	Player
17	MF	WAL	Matt Jones
19	GK	IRL	Paul Murphy
23	FW	ENG	Tommy Wright
24	FW	ENG	Lee Morris
26	MF	ENG	Junior Lewis
30	FW	FIN	Tomi Petrescu
—	GK	IRL	Conrad Logan
—	DF	ENG	Richard Stearman
—	DF	IRL	Alan Sheehan

No.	Pos.	Nation	Player
—	MF	AUS	James Wesolowski
—	MF	ENG	Tom Williamson
—	MF	IRL	Stephen Dawson
—	MF	SLE	Ahmed Deen
—	MF	PAK	Usman Gondal
—	FW	ENG	Louis Dodds
—	FW	ENG	Chris O'Grady
—	FW	ENG	Lee Tomlin

== Statistics ==
=== Overview ===
Competition	Record							
Competition	P	W	D	L	GF	GA	GD	Win %
Premier League	38	6	15	17	48	65	−17	15.79
FA Cup	2	0	1	1	3	5	−2	0.00
League Cup	2	1	0	1	1	1	+0	50.00
Total	42	7	16	19	52	71	−19	16.67

=== Appearances and goals ===
As of end of season

No.	Pos	Nat	Player	Total		Premiership		FA Cup		League Cup	
No.	Pos	Nat	Player	Apps	Goals	Apps	Goals	Apps	Goals	Apps	Goals
Goalkeepers
1	GK	(England) ENG	Ian Walker	40	0	37	0	2	0	1	0
16	GK	(Wales) WAL	Danny Coyne	5	0	1+3	0	0	0	1	0
Defenders
3	DF	(Jamaica) JAM	Frank Sinclair	17	1	11+3	1	1	0	2	0
11	DF	(England) ENG	Jordan Stewart	29	1	16+9	1	1+1	0	1+1	0
14	DF	(Scotland) SCO	Callum Davidson	15	0	8+5	0	2	0	0	0
18	DF	(Scotland) SCO	Matt Elliott	8	0	3+4	0	0+1	0	0	0
21	DF	(England) ENG	Riccardo Scimeca	31	1	28+1	1	1	0	1	0
25	DF	(England) ENG	Matt Heath	15	0	13	0	2	0	0	0
33	DF	(Wales) WAL	Ben Thatcher	29	1	28+1	1	0	0	0	0
34	DF	(France) FRA	Nicolas Priet	1	0	0	0	0	0	0+1	0
44	DF	(Greece) GRE	Nikos Dabizas	18	0	18	0	0	0	0	0
Midfielders
2	MF	(England) ENG	Andy Impey	16	0	11+2	0	1	0	2	0
5	MF	(England) ENG	Craig Hignett	15	1	3+10	1	1	0	1	0
6	MF	(Turkey) TUR	Muzzy Izzet	33	2	30	2	1	0	0+2	0
7	MF	(Northern Ireland) NIR	Keith Gillespie	13	0	7+5	0	0	0	0+1	0
8	MF	(France) FRA	Lilian Nalis	22	1	11+9	1	0	0	2	0
12	MF	(England) ENG	Paul Brooker	6	0	0+3	0	0+1	0	2	0
13	MF	(Germany) GER	Steffen Freund	14	0	13+1	0	0	0	0	0
15	MF	(England) ENG	Alan Rogers	8	0	7+1	0	0	0	0	0
27	MF	(England) ENG	Steve Guppy	17	0	9+6	0	0	0	2	0
28	MF	(Scotland) SCO	Peter Canero	7	0	2+5	0	0	0	0	0
32	MF	(Scotland) SCO	Billy McKinlay	19	0	15+1	0	2	0	1	0
Forwards
9	FW	(England) ENG	Les Ferdinand	31	13	20+9	12	1+1	1	0	0
10	FW	(England) ENG	James Scowcroft	39	5	33+2	5	2	0	1+1	0
20	FW	(Jamaica) JAM	Trevor Benjamin	4	0	2+2	0	0	0	0	0
22	FW	(Scotland) SCO	Paul Dickov	39	13	28+7	11	2	1	2	1
38	FW	(England) ENG	Marcus Bent	35	10	28+5	9	2	1	0	0
Players transferred or loaned out during the season
4	DF	(Northern Ireland) NIR	Gerry Taggart	9	0	9	0	0	0	0	0
24	DF	(England) ENG	Steve Howey	15	1	13	1	0	0	2	0
27	FW	(England) ENG	Brian Deane	7	0	0+5	0	0	0	2	0
29	DF	(England) ENG	John Curtis	17	0	14+1	0	1	0	1	0

Last updated: 30 June 2004
Source: Competitions

== Transfers ==
=== In ===
- Steve Howey – Manchester City, 5 June, undisclosed
- Riccardo Scimeca – Nottingham Forest, 24 June, free
- Paul Brooker – Brighton and Hove Albion, 24 June, free
- Danny Coyne – Grimsby Town, 3 July, free
- Keith Gillespie – Blackburn Rovers, 8 July, free
- Lilian Nalis – Chievo, 11 July, free
- Les Ferdinand – West Ham United, 11 July, free
- Ben Thatcher – Tottenham Hotspur, 17 July, £300,000
- Craig Hignett – Blackburn Rovers, 18 July, free
- Steve Guppy – Celtic, 13 January, free
- Peter Canero – Kilmarnock, 2 February, £250,000
- Lee Morris – Derby County, 2 February, nominal fee
- Nicolas Priet – Lyon, free

=== Out ===
- Tim Flowers – retired, 7 May
- Martin Reeves – released, 7 May (later joined Northampton Town on 9 June)
- Simon Royce – released, 7 May (later joined Charlton Athletic on 26 June)
- Stefan Oakes – released, 7 May (later joined Walsall on 3 July
- Nicky Summerbee – released, 7 May (later joined Bradford City on 4 September)
- Jon Ashton – released, 7 May (later joined Oxford United on 8 September)
- Matt Jones – released, 7 May (later retired on 4 June 2004)
- Michael Price – released, 7 May
- Darren Eadie – released, 7 May
- Jon Stevenson – released, 7 May (later joined Swindon Town)
- Brian Deane – West Ham United, 31 October, free
- Steve Howey – Bolton Wanderers, 29 January, undisclosed
- John Curtis – Portsmouth, 2 February, free
- Gerry Taggart – Stoke City, 26 February, free

=== Loan in ===
- Marcus Bent – Ipswich Town, 1 September, season-long loan
- Nikos Dabizas – Newcastle United, 1 January, six-month loan
- Steffen Freund – Kaiserlautern, 30 January, season-long loan

=== Loan out ===
- Tommy Wright – Brentford, 12 September
- Gerry Taggart – Stoke City, 9 December, two months

== Awards ==
=== Club awards ===
At the end of the season, Leicester's annual award ceremony, including categories voted for by the players and backroom staff, the supporters and the supporters club, saw the following players recognised for their achievements for the club throughout the 2003–04 season.

Player of the Season	Les Ferdinand
Players' Player of the Season	Les Ferdinand
Supporters' Club Player of the Season	N/A
Academy Player of the Season	Richard Stearman
Goal of the Season	Lilian Nalis (vs. Leeds United, 15 September 2003)
