= 2001–02 Leicester City F.C. season =

2001–02 season of Leicester City

Leicester City
2001–02 season
- Chairman: John Elsom
- Manager: Peter Taylor (until 30 September); Garry Parker (caretaker 30 September – 10 October); Dave Bassett (10 October – 8 April); Micky Adams (from 8 April)
- Stadium: Filbert Street
- Premiership: 20th (relegated)
- FA Cup: Fourth round
- League Cup: Third round
- Top goalscorer: League: Brian Deane (6); All: James Scowcroft (7)
- Highest home attendance: 21,886 vs Liverpool (20 Oct 2001, Premier League)
- Lowest home attendance: 14,466 vs Mansfield Town (5 Jan 2002, FA Cup)
- Average home league attendance: 19,783
Home colours	Away colours	Third colours

The 2001–02 season saw Leicester City relegated from the FA Premier League (known as the FA Barclaycard Premiership for sponsorship reasons), ending their 6-year run in England's top flight. A tumultuous season amid rising financial issues would see the Foxes go through four managers and suffer relegation to the First Division in April, finishing bottom of the league with 28 points and just five wins all season.

== Season summary ==
A terrible start to the season saw the Foxes suffer a 5-0 opening-day home defeat to newly-promoted Bolton Wanderers and Peter Taylor sacked at the end of September and Dave Bassett named as his replacement, with Micky Adams joining as assistant manager. For a while, it looked as though Bassett was capable of keeping the Foxes in the Premiership, but a four-month winless run beginning in December killed their survival hopes and they were relegated on 6 April after losing 1–0 at home to Manchester United.

Just before relegation was confirmed, Bassett became Director of Football and Adams was promoted to the manager's seat, with former Cardiff City boss Alan Cork being named as his assistant.

On 11 May 2002, Leicester played their final game at Filbert Street before moving into their new 32,000-seat home. They ended up beating Tottenham Hotspur 2–1 to attain some satisfaction from winning the final game at their 111-year-old home; it was only their fifth league win of the season. The cost of relocation combined with the money lost from relegation plunged Leicester into a serious financial crisis. The priority for next season would be to secure the club's future financially, before thinking about a promotion challenge.

== Final league table ==
Pos	Team	Pld	W	D	L	GF	GA	GD	Pts	Qualification or relegation
16	Bolton Wanderers	38	9	13	16	44	62	−18	40	
17	Sunderland	38	10	10	18	29	51	−22	40	
18	Ipswich Town (R)	38	9	9	20	41	64	−23	36	UEFA Cup QR and relegation to the First Division (Note: Ipswich Town qualified for the UEFA Cup qualifying as the winners of Premiership Fair Play League by The Football Association, and as one of the UEFA Fair Play ranking winners.)
19	Derby County (R)	38	8	6	24	33	63	−30	30	Relegation to the Football League First Division
20	Leicester City (R)	38	5	13	20	30	64	−34	28	Relegation to the Football League First Division

Source: Premier League
Rules for classification: 1) points; 2) goal difference; 3) number of goals scored.
(R) Relegated
Notes:

Results summary

Overall								Home						Away					
Pld	W	D	L	GF	GA	GD	Pts	W	D	L	GF	GA	GD	W	D	L	GF	GA	GD
38	5	13	20	30	64	−34	28	3	7	9	15	34	−19	2	6	11	15	30	−15

Source: Statto

Results by round

Round	1	2	3	4	5	6	7	8	9	10	11	12	13	14	15	16	17	18	19	20	21	22	23	24	25	26	27	28	29	30	31	32	33	34	35	36	37	38
Ground	H	A	H	A	H	H	A	A	A	H	A	H	A	H	A	H	A	H	A	A	A	H	H	A	H	A	H	A	H	A	H	H	A	H	A	H	A	H
Result	L	L	D	W	L	D	L	L	L	L	D	W	L	D	W	L	D	D	L	D	L	D	L	L	L	L	L	L	D	D	L	W	L	L	D	D	D	W
Position	20	20	18	17	18	18	19	20	20	20	20	17	18	19	17	19	18	19	20	20	20	20	20	20	20	20	20	20	20	20	20	20	20	20	20	20	20	20

Source: Statto.com
A = Away; H = Home; W = Win; D = Draw; L = Loss

== Results ==
Leicester City's score comes first

=== Legend ===
Win	Draw	Loss

=== FA Premier League ===
Date	Opponent	Venue	Result	Attendance	Scorers
18 August 2001	Bolton Wanderers	H	0–5	19,987	
25 August 2001	Arsenal	A	0–4	37,909	
8 September 2001	Ipswich Town	H	1–1	18,774	Sturridge
15 September 2001	Derby County	A	3–2	26,863	Sturridge (2), Izzet (pen)
17 September 2001	Middlesbrough	H	1–2	15,412	Jones
22 September 2001	Fulham	H	0–0	18,918	
26 September 2001	Newcastle United	A	0–1	49,185	
29 September 2001	Charlton Athletic	A	0–2	20,451	
13 October 2001	Chelsea	A	0–2	40,370	
20 October 2001	Liverpool	H	1–4	21,886	Wise
29 October 2001	Blackburn Rovers	A	0–0	21,873	
3 November 2001	Sunderland	H	1–0	20,573	Akinbiyi
17 November 2001	Manchester United	A	0–2	67,651	
24 November 2001	Everton	H	0–0	21,539	
1 December 2001	Aston Villa	A	2–0	30,711	Akinbiyi, Scowcroft
8 December 2001	Southampton	H	0–4	20,321	
16 December 2001	Leeds United	A	2–2	38,337	Deane, Scowcroft
22 December 2001	West Ham United	H	1–1	20,131	Izzet
26 December 2001	Ipswich Town	A	0–2	24,403	
29 December 2001	Bolton Wanderers	A	2–2	23,037	Ricketts (own goal), Deane
12 January 2002	West Ham United	A	0–1	34,698	
19 January 2002	Newcastle United	H	0–0	21,354	
23 January 2002	Arsenal	H	1–3	21,344	Izzet
30 January 2002	Liverpool	A	0–1	42,305	
2 February 2002	Chelsea	H	2–3	19,950	Scowcroft (2)
9 February 2002	Tottenham Hotspur	A	1–2	35,973	Oakes
23 February 2002	Derby County	H	0–3	21,620	
2 March 2002	Middlesbrough	A	0–1	25,734	
9 March 2002	Charlton Athletic	H	1–1	18,562	Scowcroft
16 March 2002	Southampton	A	2–2	30,012	Deane (2)
23 March 2002	Leeds United	H	0–2	18,976	
30 March 2002	Blackburn Rovers	H	2–1	16,236	Dickov (2)
1 April 2002	Sunderland	A	1–2	44,950	Dickov
6 April 2002	Manchester United	H	0–1	21,447	
13 April 2002	Everton	A	2–2	35,580	Deane (2)
20 April 2002	Aston Villa	H	2–2	18,125	Izzet (pen), Stevenson
27 April 2002	Fulham	A	0–0	21,106	
11 May 2002	Tottenham Hotspur	H	2–1	21,716	Dickov, Piper

=== FA Cup ===
Round	Date	Opponent	Venue	Result	Attendance	Goalscorers
R3	5 January 2002	Mansfield Town	H	2–1	14,466	Scowcroft (2)
R4	26 January 2002	West Bromwich Albion	A	0–1	26,820	

=== League Cup ===
Round	Date	Opponent	Venue	Result	Attendance	Goalscorers
R2	10 September 2001	Blackpool	A	1–0	4,866	Akinbiyi
R3	9 October 2001	Leeds United	H	0–6	16,316	

== First-team squad ==
Squad at end of season

Note: Flags indicate national team as defined under FIFA eligibility rules; some limited exceptions apply. Players may hold more than one non-FIFA nationality.

No.	Pos.	Nation	Player
1	GK	ENG	Tim Flowers
2	DF	ENG	Gary Rowett
3	DF	JAM	Frank Sinclair (Note: Sinclair was born in Lambeth, England, but also qualified to represent Jamaica internationally and made his international debut for Jamaica in 1998.)
4	DF	NIR	Gerry Taggart
5	DF	ENG	Alan Rogers
6	MF	TUR	Muzzy Izzet (Note: Izzet was born in Tower Hamlets, England, but also qualified to represent Turkey internationally and made his international debut for Turkey in 2000.)
7	MF	WAL	Matt Jones
8	MF	WAL	Robbie Savage
9	MF	ENG	Darren Eadie
10	FW	ENG	James Scowcroft
11	MF	ENG	Dennis Wise (Vice captain)
12	GK	ENG	Simon Royce
14	DF	SCO	Callum Davidson
15	DF	IRL	Damien Delaney
16	GK	ENG	Ian Walker
17	MF	ENG	Stefan Oakes
18	DF	SCO	Matt Elliott (Note: Elliott was born in Wandsworth, England, but also qualified to represent Scotland internationally and made his international debut for Scotland in 1997.) (captain)

No.	Pos.	Nation	Player
20	FW	JAM	Trevor Benjamin (Note: Benjamin was born in Kettering, England, but also qualified to represent Jamaica internationally and would make his international debut for Jamaica in November 2002.)
21	DF	DEN	Jacob Laursen
22	FW	SCO	Paul Dickov
23	MF	ENG	Jordan Stewart
24	MF	ENG	Andy Impey
25	MF	ENG	Junior Lewis
26	MF	ENG	Lee Marshall
27	FW	ENG	Brian Deane
28	DF	ENG	Matt Heath
29	MF	ENG	Matt Piper
30	GK	ENG	Michael Price
31	GK	ENG	Ian Andrews
32	FW	ENG	Jon Stevenson
33	MF	ENG	Martin Reeves
35	DF	ENG	Jon Ashton
36	FW	ENG	Tommy Wright
38	MF	ENG	Tom Williamson

=== Left club during season ===
Note: Flags indicate national team as defined under FIFA eligibility rules; some limited exceptions apply. Players may hold more than one non-FIFA nationality.

No.	Pos.	Nation	Player
35	FW	ENG	Kevin Ellison (to Stockport County)
21	FW	ENG	Dean Sturridge (to Wolverhampton Wanderers)
22	FW	NGA	Ade Akinbiyi (to Crystal Palace)

No.	Pos.	Nation	Player
—	MF	ENG	Danny Thomas (to Bournemouth)
13	FW	ISL	Arnar Gunnlaugsson (on loan to Stoke City)

=== Reserve squad ===
Note: Flags indicate national team as defined under FIFA eligibility rules; some limited exceptions apply. Players may hold more than one non-FIFA nationality.

No.	Pos.	Nation	Player
—	GK	IRL	Conrad Logan
—	DF	ENG	Ashley Lyth
—	DF	ENG	Richard Stearman
—	DF	IRL	Leon McSweeney
—	MF	ENG	Brett Darby

No.	Pos.	Nation	Player
—	MF	ENG	Stephen Dawson
—	MF	ENG	Alex Mortimer
—	FW	FIN	Tomi Petrescu
—	FW	IRL	Éamon Zayed

== Statistics ==
=== Appearances, goals and cards ===
(Starting appearances + substitute appearances)

Numbers in parentheses denote appearances as substitute.
Players with squad numbers struck through and marked † left the club during the playing season.
Players with names in italics and marked * were on loan from another club for the whole of their season with Leicester.

No.	Pos.	Name	League		FA Cup		League Cup		Total		Discipline	
No.	Pos.	Name	Apps	Goals	Apps	Goals	Apps	Goals	Apps	Goals	Yellow card	Red card
1	GK	(England) Tim Flowers	3+1	0	0	0	0	0	3+1	0	0	0
2	DF	(England) Gary Rowett	9+2	0	0	0	1	0	10+2	0	3	0
3	DF	(Jamaica) Frank Sinclair	33+2	0	1	0	2	0	36+2	0	8	0
4	DF	(Northern Ireland) Gerry Taggart	0+1	0	0	0	0	0	0+1	0	0	0
5	DF	(England) Alan Rogers	9+4	0	2	0	0	0	11+4	0	1	0
6	MF	(Turkey) Muzzy Izzet	29+2	4	2	0	2	0	33+2	4	10	1
7	MF	(Wales) Matt Jones	6+4	1	1	0	1+1	0	8+5	1	0	0
8	MF	(Wales) Robbie Savage	35	0	1	0	2	0	38	0	15	0
10	FW	(England) James Scowcroft	21+3	5	1	2	1	0	23+3	7	4	0
11	MF	(England) Dennis Wise	15+2	1	1	0	1	0	17+2	1	6	1
13	MF	(Iceland) Arnar Gunnlaugsson	0+2	0	0	0	0	0	0+2	0	0	0
14	DF	(Scotland) Callum Davidson	29+1	0	0+1	0	1+1	0	30+3	0	4	0
15	DF	(Republic of Ireland) Damien Delaney	2+1	0	0	0	1	0	3+1	0	2	0
16	GK	(England) Ian Walker	35	0	2	0	2	0	39	0	0	0
17	MF	(England) Stefan Oakes	16+5	1	1	0	0	0	17+5	1	2	0
18	DF	(Scotland) Matt Elliott	31	0	1	0	2	0	34	0	5	1
20	FW	(England) Trevor Benjamin	4+7	0	1	0	0+1	0	5+8	0	2	0
21	DF	(Denmark) Jacob Laursen	10	0	0	0	0	0	10	0	1	0
~~21~~†	FW	(England) Dean Sturridge	8+1	3	0	0	1	0	9+1	3	0	0
~~22~~†	FW	(Nigeria) Ade Akinbiyi	16+5	2	1+1	0	1	1	18+6	3	3	0
22	FW	(Scotland) Paul Dickov	11+1	4	0	0	0	0	11+1	4	5	0
23	MF	(England) Jordan Stewart	9+3	0	2	0	1	0	12+3	0	3	0
24	MF	(England) Andy Impey	20+7	0	2	0	0+2	0	22+9	0	3	0
25	MF	(England) Junior Lewis	4+2	0	0	0	1	0	5+2	0	1	1
26	MF	(England) Lee Marshall	29+6	0	2	0	1	0	32+6	0	3	1
27	FW	(England) Brian Deane	13+2	6	1	0	0	0	14+2	6	2	0
28	DF	(England) Matt Heath	3+2	0	0+1	0	0	0	3+3	0	0	0
29	FW	(England) Matt Piper	14+2	1	0+1	0	1	0	15+3	1	0	0
32	FW	(England) Jon Stevenson	0+6	1	0	0	0	0	0+6	1	0	0
33	MF	(England) Martin Reeves	1+4	0	0	0	0	0	1+4	0	1	0
35	DF	(England) Jon Ashton	3+4	0	0	0	0	0	3+4	0	0	0
36	FW	(England) Tommy Wright	0+1	0	0	0	0	0	0+1	0	0	0
38	MF	(England) Tom Williamson	0+1	0	0	0	0	0	0+1	0	0	0

=== Assists ===
Rank	Player	Assists
1	(Scotland) Callum Davidson	3
2	(Scotland) Matt Elliott (England) Stefan Oakes (Wales) Robbie Savage (England) James Scowcroft	2
3	(Nigeria) Ade Akinbiyi (England) Brian Deane (Scotland) Paul Dickov (England) Andy Impey (Turkey) Muzzy Izzet (England) Matt Piper (England) Alan Rogers (England) Jordan Stewart	1

== Transfers ==
=== In ===
Date	Pos	Name	From	Fee
25 June 2001	MF	(England) Dennis Wise	Chelsea	£1,600,000
9 July 2001	GK	(England) Ian Walker	Tottenham Hotspur	£2,500,000
31 July 2001	FW	(England) James Scowcroft	Ipswich Town	£3,000,000
16 November 2001	DF	(England) Alan Rogers	Nottingham Forest	£300,000
29 November 2001	FW	(England) Brian Deane	Middlesbrough	£150,000
10 January 2002	DF	(Denmark) Jacob Laursen	Copenhagen	£400,000
22 February 2002	FW	(Scotland) Paul Dickov	Manchester City	Nominal

=== Out ===
Date	Pos	Name	To	Fee
30 May 2001	MF	(Scotland) Stuart Campbell	Grimsby Town	£200,000
22 June 2001	FW	(England) Lawrie Dudfield	Hull City	£250,000
13 July 2001	FW	(England) Richard Cresswell	Preston North End	£500,000
2 August 2001	MF	(England) Steve Guppy	Celtic	£350,000
29 November 2001	FW	(England) Kevin Ellison	Stockport County	£55,000
24 December 2001	FW	(England) Dean Sturridge	Wolverhampton Wanderers	£350,000
5 February 2002	FW	(Nigeria) Ade Akinbiyi	Crystal Palace	£2,200,000
12 February 2002	MF	(England) Danny Thomas	Bournemouth	Free
12 May 2002	DF	(England) Gary Rowett	Charlton Athletic	£3,500,000

Transfers in: ▼£7,950,000
Transfers out: ▲£7,405,000
Total spending: ▼£545,000

=== Loan out ===
Date	Pos	Name	Club	Return	Ref
26 October 2001	GK	(England) Tim Flowers	Stockport County	26 November 2001	
15 November 2001	DF	(Republic of Ireland) Damien Delaney	Stockport County	11 February 2002	
20 November 2001	MF	(England) Matt Piper	Mansfield Town	31 December 2001	
23 November 2001	FW	(England) Dean Sturridge	Wolverhampton Wanderers	23 December 2001	
19 December 2001	FW	(Jamaica) Trevor Benjamin	Crystal Palace	21 January 2002	
24 December 2001	GK	(England) Simon Royce	Brighton & Hove Albion	25 January 2002	
7 February 2002	MF	(England) Junior Lewis	Brighton & Hove Albion	21 April 2002	
8 February 2002	FW	(Jamaica) Trevor Benjamin	Norwich City	13 March 2002	
19 February 2002	GK	(England) Tim Flowers	Coventry City	19 March 2002	
22 February 2002	FW	(Iceland) Arnar Gunnlaugsson	Stoke City	End of the season	
15 March 2002	GK	(England) Simon Royce	Manchester City	22 April 2002	
27 March 2002	FW	(Jamaica) Trevor Benjamin	West Bromwich Albion	22 April 2002	
28 March 2002	DF	(Denmark) Jacob Laursen	Wolverhampton Wanderers	24 April 2002	
28 March 2002	DF	(Republic of Ireland) Damien Delaney	Huddersfield Town	2 May 2002	

== Awards ==
=== Club awards ===
At the end of the season, Leicester's annual award ceremony, including categories voted for by the players and backroom staff, the supporters and the supporters club, saw the following players recognised for their achievements for the club throughout the 2001–02 season.

Player of the Season	Robbie Savage
Players' Player of the Season	Frank Sinclair
Academy Player of the Season	Matt Piper
Away Player of the Season	Robbie Savage
Most Improved Player of the Season	Matt Piper
Goal of the Season	James Scowcroft (vs. Leeds United, 16 December 2001)
Save of the Season	Ian Walker (vs. Blackburn Rovers, 30 March 2002)
Team Performance of the Season	vs. Derby County at Pride Park Stadium (15 September 2001)
