= 2004–05 Leicester City F.C. season =

2004–05 season of Leicester City

Leicester City
2004–05 season
- Chairman: Jim McCahill
- Manager: Micky Adams (until 11 October); Dave Bassett (caretaker 11–31 October); Craig Levein (from 31 October)
- Stadium: Walkers Stadium
- Championship: 15th
- FA Cup: Sixth round
- League Cup: Second round
- Top goalscorer: David Connolly (13)
- Average home league attendance: 24,137
Home colours	Third colours

During the 2004–05 English football season, Leicester City F.C. competed in the Football League Championship.

== Season summary ==
Leicester City were hoping to make an immediate return to the FA Premier League following relegation the previous season, but got off to a poor to indifferent start to the season, seeing them drawing too many games and prompting Micky Adams to resign in October despite claims by the club that they wanted him to continue. He was replaced by Hearts' Craig Levein, but he couldn't inspire Leicester to improve and the club finished the season in a disappointing 15th place.

== Kit ==
Leicester retained the previous season's kit, manufactured by French company Le Coq Sportif and sponsored by Narborough-based bank Alliance & Leicester.

== Final league table ==
Pos	Team	Pld	W	D	L	GF	GA	GD	Pts
13	Burnley	46	15	15	16	38	39	−1	60
14	Leeds United	46	14	18	14	49	52	−3	60
15	Leicester City	46	12	21	13	49	46	+3	57
16	Cardiff City	46	13	15	18	48	51	−3	54
17	Plymouth Argyle	46	14	11	21	52	64	−12	53

Updated to match(es) played on 9 December 2011. Source: Football League Tables
Rules for classification: 1) points; 2) goal difference; 3) number of goals scored.

Results summary

Overall								Home						Away					
Pld	W	D	L	GF	GA	GD	Pts	W	D	L	GF	GA	GD	W	D	L	GF	GA	GD
46	12	21	13	49	46	+3	57	8	8	7	24	20	+4	4	13	6	25	26	−1

Source: 2004-05 Football League Championship table

Results by round

Round	1	2	3	4	5	6	7	8	9	10	11	12	13	14	15	16	17	18	19	20	21	22	23	24	25	26	27	28	29	30	31	32	33	34	35	36	37	38	39	40	41	42	43	44	45	46
Ground	H	A	A	H	A	H	A	H	H	A	A	H	A	H	H	A	A	H	H	A	H	A	H	A	H	A	H	A	H	H	A	A	A	H	A	A	A	H	H	A	H	H	A	H	H	A
Result	D	W	L	L	D	L	W	W	D	L	W	D	D	D	D	D	D	W	L	D	W	W	L	D	L	L	W	D	W	D	L	L	D	L	D	D	D	W	D	D	L	D	L	W	W	D
Position	14	6	15	19	17	19	17	11	13	16	10	11	11	14	13	14	13	12	13	15	13	8	13	12	14	15	15	16	14	15	15	18	18	18	18	19	16	15	15	16	16	16	16	15	15	15

Source: 11v11.com: 2004-05 Leicester City results
A = Away; H = Home; W = Win; D = Draw; L = Loss

== Results ==
Leicester City's score comes first

=== Legend ===
Win	Draw	Loss

=== Football League Championship ===
Date	Opponent	Venue	Result	Attendance	Scorers
7 August 2004	West Ham United	H	0-0	30,231	
11 August 2004	Derby County	A	2-1	26,650	Nalis, Benjamin
14 August 2004	Millwall	A	0-2	11,754	
21 August 2004	Watford	H	0-1	22,478	
28 August 2004	Wolverhampton Wanderers	A	1–1	27,550	Scowcroft
30 August 2004	Brighton & Hove Albion	H	0–1	22,263	
11 September 2004	Rotherham United	A	2–0	6,272	Nalis, Dublin
14 September 2004	Sheffield United	H	3-2	23,422	Scowcroft, Dabizas, Wilcox
18 September 2004	Burnley	H	0–0	22,495	
25 September 2004	Queens Park Rangers	A	2-3	15,535	Scowcroft, Connolly
28 September 2004	Gillingham	A	2–0	6,089	Heath, Dublin
2 October 2004	Preston North End	H	1-1	21,249	Benjamin
16 October 2004	Coventry City	A	1-1	18,054	Dublin
19 October 2004	Ipswich Town	H	2–2	22,497	Connolly, Heath
23 October 2004	Stoke City	H	1–1	22,882	Halls (own goal)
30 October 2004	Cardiff City	A	0-0	13,759	
2 November 2004	Crewe Alexandra	A	2–2	6,849	Nalis, Guðjónsson
8 November 2004	Coventry City	H	3-0	22,479	Nalis, Tiatto, Heath
13 November 2004	Sunderland	H	0–1	25,897	
20 November 2004	Wigan Athletic	A	0–0	10,924	
27 November 2004	Plymouth Argyle	H	2–1	23,799	Scowcroft, Dublin
4 December 2004	Leeds United	A	2–0	27,384	Nalis, Kelly (own goal)
11 December 2004	Reading	H	0–2	24,068	
17 December 2004	Nottingham Forest	A	1–1	21,415	Connolly
26 December 2004	Rotherham United	H	0–1	27,014	
28 December 2004	Sheffield United	A	0–2	22,100	
3 January 2005	Queens Park Rangers	H	1–0	23,754	Connolly (pen)
15 January 2005	Preston North End	A	1–1	12,677	Connolly
22 January 2005	Gillingham	H	2-0	23,457	Connolly, Nosworthy (own goal)
5 February 2005	Crewe Alexandra	H	1-1	27,011	Gillespie
12 February 2005	Ipswich Town	A	1-2	27,392	Stewart
22 February 2005	Stoke City	A	2–3	14,076	Williams, Guðjónsson
26 February 2005	Reading	A	0–0	14,651	
5 March 2005	Nottingham Forest	H	0-1	27,277	
8 March 2005	Burnley	A	0–0	10,933	
15 March 2005	Watford	A	2-2	11,084	Connolly, Hughes
18 March 2005	West Ham United	A	2–2	22,031	Connolly (pen), Gillespie
2 April 2005	Millwall	H	3-1	22,338	Stearman, Connolly (pen), De Vries
5 April 2005	Wolverhampton Wanderers	H	1–1	22,950	Maybury
9 April 2005	Brighton & Hove Albion	A	1–1	6,638	Connolly (pen)
16 April 2005	Wigan Athletic	H	0-2	23,894	
19 April 2005	Cardiff City	H	1–1	21,336	Connolly
23 April 2005	Sunderland	A	1-2	34,815	Maybury
26 April 2005	Derby County	H	1–0	25,762	Connolly
1 May 2005	Leeds United	H	2–0	26,593	Dublin, Connolly
8 May 2005	Plymouth Argyle	A	0-0	19,199	

=== FA Cup ===
Round	Date	Opponent	Venue	Result	Attendance	Goalscorers
R3	8 January 2005	Blackpool	H	2-2	16,750	Williams, Edwards (own goal)
R3R	15 January 2005	Blackpool	A	1-0	6,938	Guðjónsson
R4	29 January 2005	Reading	A	2–1	14,825	Williams, Scowcroft
R5	19 February 2005	Charlton Athletic	A	2-1	23,719	Dabizas, Dublin
QF	13 March 2005	Blackburn Rovers	A	0-1	22,113	

=== League Cup ===
Round	Date	Opponent	Venue	Result	Attendance	Goalscorers
R2	4 October 2004	Preston North End	H	2-3	6,751	Guðjónsson (pen), Blake

== Squad ==
Note: Flags indicate national team as defined under FIFA eligibility rules; some limited exceptions apply. Players may hold more than one non-FIFA nationality.

No.	Pos.	Nation	Player
1	GK	ENG	Ian Walker
2	DF	SCO	Peter Canero
3	DF	AUS	Danny Tiatto
4	DF	GRE	Nikos Dabizas
5	MF	SCO	Stephen Hughes
6	DF	ENG	Matt Heath
7	MF	NIR	Keith Gillespie
8	MF	FRA	Lilian Nalis
9	FW	ENG	Dion Dublin
10	FW	ENG	James Scowcroft
11	MF	ENG	Jordan Stewart
12	FW	ENG	Stefan Moore (on loan from Aston Villa)
14	DF	ENG	Darren Kenton (on loan from Southampton)
15	MF	SCO	Scot Gemmill
16	MF	SCO	Gareth Williams

No.	Pos.	Nation	Player
17	DF	ENG	Richard Stearman
19	FW	IRL	David Connolly
20	DF	IRL	Paddy McCarthy (from March)
21	MF	ENG	Jason Wilcox
22	MF	ISL	Joey Guðjónsson
23	MF	ENG	Tommy Wright
24	DF	IRL	Alan Maybury
25	FW	WAL	Nathan Blake
26	FW	NED	Mark de Vries
27	MF	ENG	Lee Morris
28	MF	IRL	Stephen Dawson
29	DF	ENG	Alan Sheehan
30	GK	IRL	Conrad Logan
31	FW	ENG	Chris O'Grady
33	GK	CAN	Lars Hirschfeld

=== Left club during season ===
Note: Flags indicate national team as defined under FIFA eligibility rules; some limited exceptions apply. Players may hold more than one non-FIFA nationality.

No.	Pos.	Nation	Player
5	DF	ENG	Martin Keown (to Reading)
12	DF	ENG	Chris Makin (to Derby County)
13	GK	ENG	Stuart Taylor (on loan from Arsenal)
14	MF	SCO	Kevin Harper (on loan from Portsmouth)

No.	Pos.	Nation	Player
18	DF	SCO	Matt Elliott (retired)
20	FW	JAM	Trevor Benjamin (to Northampton)
36	GK	ENG	Kevin Pressman (to Leeds United)
—	MF	WAL	Paul Ashton (to Grimsby Town)

== Transfers ==
=== In ===
Date	Pos	Name	From	Fee	Notes
1 July 2004	MF	(England) Jason Wilcox	(England) Leeds United	Free transfer	
1 July 2004	FW	(England) Dion Dublin	(England) Aston Villa	Free transfer	
1 July 2004	DF	(Australia) Danny Tiatto	(England) Manchester City	Free transfer	
1 July 2004	MF	(Scotland) Gareth Williams	(England) Nottingham Forest	£500,000	
14 July 2004	GK	(England) Kevin Pressman	(England) Sheffield Wednesday	Free transfer	
20 July 2004	DF	(England) Martin Keown	(England) Arsenal	Free transfer	
20 July 2004	FW	(Republic of Ireland) David Connolly	(England) West Ham United	£500,000	
1 August 2004	FW	(Wales) Nathan Blake	(England) Wolverhampton Wanderers	Free transfer	
1 August 2004	MF	(Iceland) Joey Guðjónsson	(Spain) Real Betis	Free transfer	
2 August 2004	DF	(England) Chris Makin	(England) Ipswich Town	Free transfer	
5 August 2004	MF	(Scotland) Scot Gemmill	(England) Everton	Free transfer	
6 January 2005	FW	(Netherlands) Mark de Vries	(Scotland) Hearts	Nominal	
6 January 2005	DF	(Republic of Ireland) Alan Maybury	(Scotland) Hearts	Nominal	
29 January 2005	GK	(Canada) Lars Hirschfeld	(Scotland) Dundee United	Free transfer	
31 January 2005	MF	(Scotland) Stephen Hughes	(Scotland) Rangers	£100,000	
3 March 2005	DF	(Republic of Ireland) Paddy McCarthy	(England) Manchester City	£100,000	
27 April 2005	DF	(Australia) Patrick Kisnorbo	(Scotland) Hearts	Free transfer	

=== Out ===
Date	Pos	Name	To	Fee	Notes
17 May 2004	DF	(England) Alan Rogers	(England) Nottingham Forest	Free transfer	
18 May 2004	DF	(England) Riccardo Scimeca	(England) West Bromwich Albion	£100,000	
19 May 2004	MF	(England) Andy Impey	(England) Nottingham Forest	Free transfer	
3 June 2004	MF	(Turkey) Muzzy Izzet	(England) Birmingham City	Free transfer	
7 June 2004	FW	(Scotland) Paul Dickov	(England) Blackburn Rovers	£150,000	
21 June 2004	DF	(England) Ben Thatcher	(England) Manchester City	£100,000	
1 July 2004	MF	(England) Steve Guppy	(England) Leeds United	Free transfer	
1 July 2004	MF	(Scotland) Billy McKinlay	(England) Fulham	Free transfer	
2 July 2004	MF	(England) Paul Brooker	(England) Reading	Free transfer	
5 July 2004	FW	(England) Les Ferdinand	(England) Bolton Wanderers	Free transfer	
5 July 2004	MF	(England) Junior Lewis	(England) Hull City	Free transfer	
10 July 2004	DF	(Scotland) Callum Davidson	(England) Preston North End	Free transfer	
17 July 2004	GK	(Wales) Danny Coyne	(England) Burnley	£25,000	
23 July 2004	DF	(Jamaica) Frank Sinclair	(England) Burnley	Free transfer	
23 July 2004	DF	(France) Nicolas Priet	(England) Doncaster Rovers	Free transfer	
1 August 2004	MF	(England) Craig Hignett	(England) Leeds United	Free transfer	
29 October 2004	MF	(England) Tom Williamson	(England) Canvey Island	Free transfer	
19 January 2005	FW	(Jamaica) Trevor Benjamin	(England) Northampton Town	Free transfer	
28 January 2005	DF	(England) Martin Keown	(England) Reading	Free transfer	
31 January 2005	DF	(Scotland) Matt Elliott	Retired		
25 February 2005	GK	(England) Kevin Pressman	(England) Leeds United	Free transfer	
17 May 2005	MF	(France) Lilian Nalis	(England) Sheffield United	Free transfer	

Transfers in: ▼£1,200,000
Transfers out: ▲£375,000
Total spending: ▼£825,000
