= Jon Ashton =

English footballer (born 1982)

Personal information
- Full name: Jonathan James Ashton
- Date of birth: 4 October 1982 (age 44)
- Place of birth: Nuneaton, England
- Height: 6 ft 2 in (1.88 m)
- Position: Defender

Team information
- Current team: Ipswich Town (fitness coach)

Youth career
- 1994–2001: Leicester City

Senior career*
Years	Team	Apps	(Gls)
2001–2003	Leicester City	9	(0)
2002	→ Notts County (loan)	4	(0)
2003	→ Oxford United (loan)	6	(0)
2003–2006	Oxford United	91	(1)
2006–2007	Rushden & Diamonds	40	(2)
2007–2009	Grays Athletic	57	(2)
2009–2015	Stevenage	192	(5)
2015–2016	Crawley Town	30	(0)
2016–2017	Braintree Town	15	(0)
2017	→ Grays Athletic (loan)	9	(0)
2017	Grays Athletic	0	(0)
2017–2018	Nuneaton Town	14	(0)
Total		467	(10)

International career
2007	England C	4	(1)
- * Club domestic league appearances and goals

Jonathan James Ashton (born 4 October 1982) is an English former professional footballer who played as a defender. He is a first-team fitness coach at Premier League club Ipswich Town.

A graduate of Leicester City's youth system, Ashton made seven Premier League appearances during the 2001–02 season and had loan spells at Notts County and Oxford United, joining Oxford permanently in September 2003. He made 103 appearances for the club before moving to Rushden & Diamonds and subsequently Grays Athletic in May 2007, where he also won four caps for the England C team.

He signed for Stevenage Borough in January 2009 and made 234 appearances across six years, helping the club achieve successive promotions from the Conference Premier to League One. After leaving Stevenage in 2015, Ashton had spells with Crawley Town, Braintree Town and his hometown club Nuneaton Town, where he ended his playing career in 2018. Following his retirement, he moved into fitness coaching, initially with Stevenage before joining Ipswich Town in May 2021.

== Early life ==
He was born in Nuneaton, Warwickshire, and grew up in Whitestone, attending St Thomas More Catholic School.

== Club career ==
=== Early career ===
Ashton began his career at Leicester City's youth academy and signed his first professional contract in January 2001. He made his senior debut in the Premier League on 23 March 2002, playing the full match in a 2–0 defeat to Leeds United at Filbert Street, and featured in six more matches towards the end of the 2001–02 season. Following Leicester's relegation, he signed a new three-year contract on 31 May 2002. Ashton started the opening match of the 2002–03 season, a 6–1 defeat to Ipswich Town, but only made one further appearance before joining Notts County on a one-month loan on 8 November 2002. He played four matches for Notts County and, upon returning to Leicester, was made available for transfer at the end of the season.

=== Oxford United ===
Ashton joined Third Division club Oxford United on a one-month loan ahead of the start of the 2003–04 season and made his debut in a 1–0 victory against Lincoln City on the opening day. After seven appearances during an unbeaten start to the season, the move was made permanent on 8 September 2003. He established himself as a regular that season, making 38 appearances as Oxford finished ninth in Division Three.

He continued to feature consistently during the 2004–05 season, playing 31 matches in all competitions, and was sent off for the first time in his career in a 4–0 defeat to Southend United on 6 November 2004. In the 2005–06 season, under manager Brian Talbot, Ashton made 34 appearances and scored his first professional goal in a 1–1 draw with Rochdale on 4 February 2006. After being publicly criticised by Talbot for his role in a defeat to Stockport County on 11 March 2006, he played just once more that season and was released by successor Jim Smith in May 2006.

=== Rushden & Diamonds ===
A month after his release from Oxford, Ashton signed for Conference National club Rushden & Diamonds, making his debut on the opening day of the 2006–07 season in a 1–0 defeat to Crawley Town. He was a regular in central defence and scored his first goal for the club from the penalty spot in a 4–1 away victory against Tamworth on 12 September 2006. Despite appearing regularly, Ashton was transfer-listed by new manager Garry Hill in April 2007 and subsequently told he was free to find a new club. He made 45 appearances in all competitions and scored twice during his sole season at Rushden.

=== Grays Athletic ===
A month later, Ashton joined fellow Conference Premier club Grays Athletic on a free transfer, signing a two-year contract. He made his debut in a 0–0 draw away to Torquay United on 12 August 2007, and scored his first goal two weeks later with a header in a 1–0 win against Altrincham. Ashton made 47 appearances in all competitions during the 2007–08 season as Grays finished tenth in the Conference Premier, and was named both Players' Player of The Year and Supporters' Player of The Year at the club's end-of-season awards on 12 May 2008. He played 19 further matches in the first half of the 2008–09 season, but was transfer-listed after stating he would not be remaining at the club once his contract expired.

=== Stevenage ===
Ashton subsequently signed for fellow Conference Premier club Stevenage Borough for an undisclosed fee on 29 January 2009, reuniting him with manager Graham Westley, who had previously managed him at Rushden & Diamonds. He made his debut in a 1–0 victory over Woking at Broadhall Way on 24 February 2009, and went on to make 13 appearances during the remainder of the 2008–09 season. Ashton scored his first goal for Stevenage in a 2–0 win over Eastbourne Borough on 9 September 2009, heading in Joel Byrom's cross. Ashton made 45 appearances in his first full season, scoring three times, as Stevenage won the Conference Premier by 11 points, earning promotion to the Football League for the first time in the club's history. He was part of a defence that conceded 24 goals in 44 games, keeping 27 clean sheets.

He played his first match of the 2010–11 season in Stevenage's first-ever victory in the Football League, a 3–1 win over Stockport County on 21 August 2010. Like the previous season, Stevenage's success relied on a strong defence, keeping 19 clean sheets and conceding the fewest goals in League Two. He made 38 appearances, scoring once, as Stevenage earned promotion to League One in their debut Football League season. At the end of the season, Ashton was named both the club's Players' Player of the Year and Player of the Year. He signed a new two-year contract with the club in September 2011, and made 53 appearances in all competitions during the 2011–12 season, scoring once, as Stevenage finished sixth and were beaten in the League One play-off semi-finals. Only league champions Charlton Athletic conceded fewer goals that season.

Ashton remained at Stevenage for the 2012–13 season, with the club stating that they had rejected several transfer bids for him and fellow centre-back Mark Roberts from Doncaster Rovers. Ashton made nine appearances as Stevenage remained unbeaten in the league during the opening two months, before suffering an Achilles injury in a 2–2 draw with Bury at Broadhall Way on 29 September 2012, which proved to be his final game of the season. Although he returned to first-team training in January 2013, he ruptured the Achilles in a training session, ruling him out for the remainder of the season. Following manager Gary Smith's departure in March 2013, Ashton joined the club's coaching staff while a new manager was appointed. At the end of the season, with his contract expiring in June 2013, he signed a new two-year deal with Stevenage, keeping him at Stevenage until the summer of 2015.

Ahead of the 2013–14 season, Ashton was appointed club captain following the departure of Mark Roberts. Manager Graham Westley described him as "the ideal man to lead our team forward", highlighting his leadership and history at the club. Ashton made 48 appearances in all competitions as Stevenage were relegated to League Two after finishing last in League One. He signed a new contract on 17 May 2014, and played 21 times during the 2014–15 season, including in the League Two play-offs, as Stevenage failed to secure an immediate return to League One after losing at the semi-final stage. He left the club upon the expiry of his contract in July 2015. Across six years at Stevenage, Ashton made 234 appearances, placing him 12th in the club's all-time appearance records.

=== Later career ===
Following his departure from Stevenage, Ashton signed a one-year contract with League Two club Crawley Town on 8 July 2015. He made his debut in a 1–1 draw against former club Oxford United on 8 August 2015, and went on to make 30 appearances as Crawley finished 20th in League Two. After his contract expired, Ashton signed for National League club Braintree Town on 19 July 2016.

Having made 15 appearances for Braintree during the first half of the 2016–17 season, he returned to former club Grays Athletic on an initial one-month loan on 25 January 2017, which was later extended for a further month. Ashton made nine appearances during the remainder of the loan spell, and signed permanently for the Isthmian League North club on 8 July 2017. He left Grays to become player-assistant manager at his hometown club, Nuneaton Town of the National League North, joining on 2 August 2017. Ashton made 17 appearances for Nuneaton in the dual role before retiring from playing at the end of the season.

== International career ==
Ashton was called up to the England C team, who represent England at non-League level, in May 2007 for the Four Nations Tournament in Scotland. He earned three caps during the competition, scoring once in a 3–0 victory over Scotland on 25 May 2007. The following month, he won a fourth cap in a friendly against Finland under-21s.

== Coaching career ==
Following his retirement, Ashton returned to Stevenage as first-team fitness coach in June 2018, reuniting with manager Dino Maamria, who had been his assistant manager during his playing career at Stevenage. The two had also previously worked together at Nuneaton Town, where Maamria was manager and Ashton served as assistant manager. He remained at Stevenage for three seasons before joining Ipswich Town as first-team fitness coach in May 2021.

== Style of play ==
Ashton was primarily deployed as a centre-back, though he was also occasionally used as a right-back. During his time at Rushden, he initially played as a holding midfielder before reverting to central defence following injuries within the squad. He was described by FourFourTwo in 2012 as a "no-nonsense" centre-back with agility and "a good turn of pace" when named among the magazine's Top 50 Football League players.

== Personal life ==
Ashton was arrested alongside Danny Foster in May 2008, facing three counts of vandalism after the pair removed a number of advertising banners in Aviemore.

He is a qualified Pilates instructor and owns a Pilates business, having discovered during his playing career that it helped extend his time in football.

== Career statistics ==
Appearances and goals by club, season and competition
Club	Season	League			FA Cup		League Cup		Other		Total	
Club	Season	Division	Apps	Goals	Apps	Goals	Apps	Goals	Apps	Goals	Apps	Goals
Leicester City	2000–01	Premier League	0	0	0	0	0	0	0	0	0	0
Leicester City	2001–02	Premier League	7	0	0	0	0	0	—		7	0
Leicester City	2002–03	First Division	2	0	0	0	1	0	—		3	0
Leicester City	2003–04	Premier League	0	0	—		—		—		0	0
Leicester City	Total		9	0	0	0	1	0	0	0	10	0
Notts County (loan)	2002–03	Second Division	4	0	—		—		—		4	0
Oxford United	2003–04	Third Division	34	0	1	0	2	0	1 (Note: Appearance(s) in Football League Trophy)	0	38	0
Oxford United	2004–05	League Two	30	0	0	0	1	0	0	0	31	0
Oxford United	2005–06	League Two	33	1	1	0	0	0	0	0	34	1
Oxford United	Total		97	1	2	0	3	0	1	0	103	1
Rushden & Diamonds	2006–07	Conference National	40	2	1	0	—		4 (Note: Three appearances in FA Trophy; one appearance in Northamptonshire Senior Cup)	0	45	2
Grays Athletic	2007–08	Conference Premier	40	2	2	0	—		5 (Note: Three appearances in FA Trophy; two appearances in Conference League Cup)	0	47	2
Grays Athletic	2008–09	Conference Premier	17	0	2	0	—		1 (Note: Appearance(s) in FA Trophy)	0	20	0
Grays Athletic	Total		57	2	4	0	0	0	6	0	67	2
Stevenage	2008–09	Conference Premier	11	0	—		—		2 (Note: Appearances in 2009 Conference Premier play-offs)	0	13	0
Stevenage	2009–10	Conference Premier	35	3	3	0	—		7	0	45	3
Stevenage	2010–11	League Two	38	1	5	0	0	0	2 (Note: One appearance in Football League Trophy; one appearance in 2011 League Two play-offs)	0	45	1
Stevenage	2011–12	League One	43	1	6	0	1	0	3 (Note: One appearance in Football League Trophy; two appearances in 2012 League One play-offs)	0	53	1
Stevenage	2012–13	League One	8	0	0	0	1	0	0	0	9	0
Stevenage	2013–14	League One	40	0	4	0	2	0	2	0	48	0
Stevenage	2014–15	League Two	17	0	1	0	1	0	2 (Note: One appearance in Football League Trophy; one appearance in 2015 League Two play-offs)	0	21	0
Stevenage	Total		192	5	19	0	5	0	18	0	234	5
Crawley Town	2015–16	League Two	30	0	0	0	0	0	0	0	30	0
Braintree Town	2016–17	National League	15	0	0	0	—		0	0	15	0
Grays Athletic (loan)	2016–17	Isthmian League Premier Division	9	0	0	0	—		0	0	9	0
Nuneaton Town	2017–18	National League North	14	0	0	0	—		3 (Note: Two appearances in FA Trophy; one appearance in Birmingham Senior Cup)	0	17	0
Career total			467	10	26	0	9	0	32	0	534	10

== Honours ==
Stevenage

- Football League Two play-offs: 2011
- Conference Premier: 2009–10
- FA Trophy runner-up: 2009–10

Individual

- Stevenage Player of the Year: 2010–11
