= James Scowcroft =

English footballer and coach

Personal information
- Full name: James Benjamin Scowcroft
- Date of birth: 15 November 1975 (age 51)
- Place of birth: Bury St Edmunds, England
- Height: 6 ft 1 in (1.85 m)
- Position: Striker

Youth career
- 1986–1994: Ipswich Town

Senior career*
Years	Team	Apps	(Gls)
1994–2001	Ipswich Town	206	(47)
2001–2005	Leicester City	133	(24)
2005	→ Ipswich Town (loan)	9	(0)
2005–2006	Coventry City	41	(3)
2006–2009	Crystal Palace	83	(14)
2009–2010	Leyton Orient	26	(0)
2010–2012	Bury Town	26	(8)
Total		524	(96)

International career
1996–1997	England U21	5	(0)
- * Club domestic league appearances and goals

James Benjamin Scowcroft (born 15 November 1975) is an English retired footballer who played as a striker. He is a European Scout for Crystal Palace.

Scowcroft began his career at Ipswich Town, graduating from the club's academy. He went on to score over 50 goals and make over 200 appearances for Ipswich, helping the club win promotion to the Premier League in 2000. He joined Leicester City in 2001, spending four seasons at the club, including helping the club return to the Premier League in 2003. He returned to Ipswich on loan during the 2004–05 season before joining Coventry City in 2005. He spent one season at Coventry before leaving to join Crystal Palace in 2006. He spent three seasons at Crystal Palace. In 2009 he joined Leyton Orient, spending one season with the club. After his release from Leyton Orient in 2010, Scowcroft joined hometown club Bury Town.

He won five caps for the England U21 national team between 1996 and 1997.

== Club career ==
Born in Bury St Edmunds, Suffolk, Scowcroft started his career as a youth player at nearby Ipswich Town, joining the club at the age of 11. He progressed to become a regular first team player, gaining five England Under-21 caps in the process. From 1994 to 2001 he played over 200 games for the club, scoring over 50 goals. He was named player's and fan's Player of the Year in 2000 but missed out on the play off final with a hamstring injury, which saw Ipswich promoted to the Premier League. At the end of the 2000–01 season, he was sold to Leicester City for £3m, where he played over 150 games, scoring fewer than 30 goals. During his period at Leicester Scowcroft was accused of being involved in the alleged sexual assault of three women at La Manga golf club, Spain, but was cleared of all charges, having been mistakenly identified. He was loaned back to Ipswich in the spring of 2005.

Scowcroft was then signed by Coventry City on a free transfer. He was used primarily on the right sometimes as the right wing for Coventry for the 2005–06 season. He left Coventry City to join Crystal Palace for £500,000 in July 2006. He was released by the club in May 2009 having made a total of 86 senior appearances scoring 14 times. He then joined Leyton Orient but after fitness problems and failing to score a goal in 20 games for Orient, he was released a year later.

In September 2010, Scowcroft joined non-league hometown club, Bury Town, signing a "pay-as-you-play" deal. He made his debut as a substitute in an away game against Wealdstone later the same month. In January 2012 Bury Town announced Scowcroft's retirement from football, having failed to recover from an injury sustained during a pre-season friendly.

== Career statistics ==
Appearances and goals by club, season and competition
Club	Season	League			FA Cup		League Cup		Other		Total	
Club	Season	Division	Apps	Goals	Apps	Goals	Apps	Goals	Apps	Goals	Apps	Goals
Ipswich Town	1995–96	First Division	27	2	2	0	0	0	0	0	29	2
Ipswich Town	1996–97	First Division	41	9	1	0	6	1	2 (Note: Appearances in First Division play-offs)	1	50	11
Ipswich Town	1997–98	First Division	31	6	4	0	4	1	2	0	41	7
Ipswich Town	1998–99	First Division	32	13	0	0	2	1	2	0	36	14
Ipswich Town	1999–00	First Division	41	13	1	0	4	2	2	0	48	15
Ipswich Town	2000–01	Premier League	34	4	2	0	7	2	—		43	6
Ipswich Town	Total		206	47	10	0	23	7	8	1	247	55
Leicester City	2001–02	Premier League	24	5	1	2	1	0	—		26	7
Leicester City	2002–03	First Division	43	10	3	1	1	0	—		47	11
Leicester City	2003–04	Premier League	35	5	2	0	2	0	—		39	5
Leicester City	2004–05	Championship	31	4	3	1	1	0	—		35	5
Leicester City	Total		133	24	9	4	5	0	0	0	147	28
Ipswich Town (loan)	2004–05	Championship	9	0	0	0	0	0	0	0	9	0
Coventry City	2005–06	Championship	41	3	3	0	1	0	—		45	3
Crystal Palace	2006–07	Championship	35	5	1	0	0	0	—		36	5
Crystal Palace	2007–08	Championship	38	9	1	0	0	0	1 (Note: Appearance in Championship play-offs)	0	40	9
Crystal Palace	2008–09	Championship	10	0	0	0	0	0	—		10	0
Crystal Palace	Total		83	14	2	0	0	0	1	0	86	14
Leyton Orient	2009–10	League One	26	0	1	0	1	0	2 (Note: Appearances in Football League Trophy)	0	30	0
Bury Town	2010–11	IL Premier Division	26	8	0	0	—		0	0	26	8
Career totals			524	96	25	4	30	7	11	1	590	108

== Honours ==
Ipswich Town

- Football League First Division play-offs: 2000

Leicester City

- Football League First Division runner-up: 2002–03

Individual

- Nationwide Player of the Month: December 1999
- Ipswich Town Player of the season: 1999–2000
- Leicester City Goal of the season: 2001–02
- Crystal Palace Goal of the Season: 2007–08
