= Nicolas Priet =

French footballer (born 1983)

Personal information
- Date of birth: 31 January 1983 (age 43)
- Place of birth: Villeurbanne, France
- Height: 1.93 m (6 ft 4 in)
- Position: Defender

Senior career*
Years	Team	Apps	(Gls)
–2003	Lyon	0	(0)
2003–2004	Leicester City	0	(0)
2004–2005	Doncaster Rovers	7	(0)
2005–2007	Rouen		
2007–2008	Saint-Priest		
2008–2009	FC Sète 34	33	(0)
2009–2010	Beauvais	21	(1)
2010–2011	AS Béziers	25	(2)
2011–2014	Lyon-Duchère	69	(3)
2014–20xx	Limonest		
- * Club domestic league appearances and goals

Nicolas Priet (born 31 January 1983) is a French former professional footballer who played as a defender.

== Career ==
=== Youth career and England stints ===
Priet spent his youth career with Sainte-Marguerite, a small club in Marseille, Grenoble, and Olympique Lyonnais. He was released by Lyon at the end of his trainee contract.

In 2003 Priet trialled with Leicester City of the Premier League and, after impressing manager Micky Adams, signed a contract . At Leicester he only made a two-minute substitute appearance in the Carling Cup. Upon his release by Leicester in 2004 he moved to Doncaster Rovers. He was released by Doncaster Rovers and trialled with Swindon Town.

=== Return to France ===
Priet returned to France where he went on to play for FC Rouen, AS Saint-Priest, and FC Sète 34.

Priet joined Championnat National side AS Beauvais Oise from league rivals FC Sète 34 in July 2009.

He signed for Championnat de France amateur club AS Lyon-Duchère from AS Béziers in June 2011, who had been relegated from the league at the end of the previous season.

After finishing sixth with Lyon-Duchère in the 2013–14 season, he left the club for FC Limonest Saint-Didier.
