= Matt Piper =

English footballer and coach

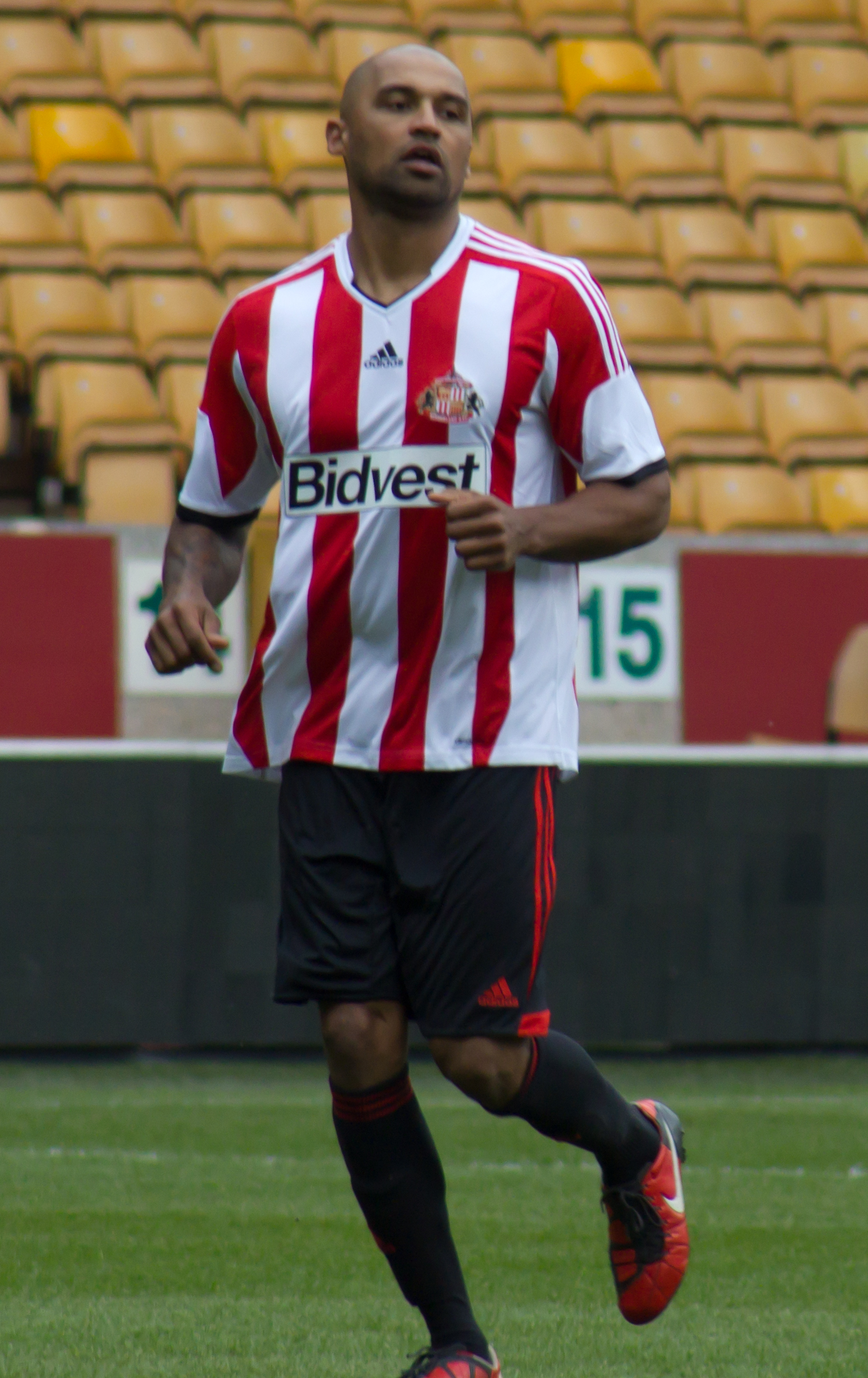
- Piper during Jody Craddock testimonial match in 2014

Personal information
- Full name: Matthew James Piper
- Date of birth: 29 September 1981 (age 45)
- Place of birth: Leicester, England
- Height: 6 ft 1 in (1.85 m)
- Position: Winger

Youth career
- Leicester City

Senior career*
Years	Team	Apps	(Gls)
2000–2002	Leicester City	16	(1)
2001–2002	→ Mansfield Town (loan)	8	(1)
2002–2006	Sunderland	24	(0)
2008	Anstey Nomads	1	(0)
2011–2012	Oadby Town	29	(7)
Total		68	(10)
- * Club domestic league appearances and goals

Matthew James Piper (born 29 September 1981) is an English former professional footballer and current coach, who played as a winger.

== Career ==
Piper came through the youth ranks of hometown club Leicester City. After signing a professional contract in 2000, he made his first team debut in the League Cup on 9 October 2001, playing the whole of a 6–0 home defeat to Leeds United. After another appearance in a 4–1 league defeat to Liverpool, he was loaned to Mansfield Town, for whom he played eight times. He impressed there, and scored his first senior goal against Swansea City. On his return in January 2002, Piper played 27 games as Leicester fought relegation from the Premier League. Although Leicester were ultimately relegated with a mere five league wins all season, Piper made his mark in the club's history by scoring the last ever competitive goal at Filbert Street on 11 May 2002, in a 2–1 win against Tottenham Hotspur.

Sunderland signed Piper from Leicester in August 2002, for a fee of £3.5 million. Despite initially impressing, Piper's time at Sunderland was mostly an unhappy one as he suffered a number of serious injuries, resulting in him having ten operations in three years. Piper missed most of the 2003–04 and 2004–05 seasons due to injury and rehabilitation.

Following Sunderland's promotion to the Premiership in the 2004–05, Piper was included in Sunderland's squad for the pre-season tour of the United States and Canada, playing in two friendlies against American opposition. Piper made just one start against Cheltenham Town in the League Cup. This was to be Piper's final appearance for Sunderland, and his contract was terminated by mutual consent in January 2006 following an unsuccessful trial with Coventry City. He had made just 29 appearances, including 15 starts, in three and a half years at Sunderland.

In the summer of 2007, Piper participated in pre-season training at Mansfield Town, in an attempt to rebuild his fitness. However, he decided to retire before the start of the 2007–08 season. In March 2008, he started training with local side Anstey Nomads. He managed just one appearance before retiring from football completely.

Piper retired at the age of 26, and has since spoken about his battles with drink and drugs as a result.

== Career statistics ==
Appearances and goals by club, season and competition
Club	Season	League			FA Cup		League Cup		Other		Total	
Club	Season	Division	Apps	Goals	Apps	Goals	Apps	Goals	Apps	Goals	Apps	Goals
Leicester City	2001–02	Premier League	16	1	1	0	1	0	0	0	18	1
Mansfield Town (loan)	2000–01	Division Three	8	1	0	0	0	0	0	0	8	1
Sunderland	2002–03	Premier League	13	0	0	0	1	0	0	0	14	0
Sunderland	2003–04	First Division	9	0	1	0	1	0	0	0	11	0
Sunderland	2004–05	Championship	2	0	1	0	0	0	0	0	3	0
Sunderland	2005–06	Premier League	0	0	0	0	1	0	0	0	1	0
Sunderland	Total		24	0	2	0	3	0	0	0	29	0
Career total			48	2	3	0	4	0	0	0	55	2

Awards
Preceded by N/A	Leicester City F.C. Young Player of the Year; 2002	Succeeded by N/A
