= Muzzy Izzet =

Footballer (born 1974)

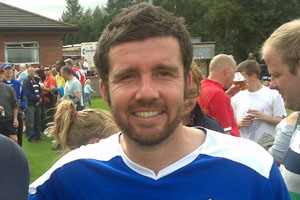
- Izzet in 2010

Personal information
- Full name: Mustafa Kemal Izzet
- Date of birth: 31 October 1974 (age 52)
- Place of birth: Mile End, London, England
- Height: 5 ft 10 in (1.78 m)
- Position: Midfielder

Youth career
- Senrab
- Charlton Athletic
- Chelsea

Senior career*
Years	Team	Apps	(Gls)
1993–1996	Chelsea	0	(0)
1996	→ Leicester City (loan)	9	(1)
1996–2004	Leicester City	260	(37)
2004–2006	Birmingham City	26	(1)
2009	Thurmaston Town	1	(0)
Total		296	(39)

International career
2000–2004	Turkey	9	(0)
Medal record
Third place	FIFA World Cup	2002
- * Club domestic league appearances and goals

Mustafa Kemal "Muzzy" Izzet (/ˈɪzɪt/; Turkish: İzzet; born 31 October 1974) is a former professional footballer who played as a midfielder for Chelsea, Leicester City, Birmingham City between 1993 and 2006.

Born in England, he played for the Turkey national team internationally. He was part of the Turkey squad for UEFA Euro 2000 and the squad that won bronze at the 2002 FIFA World Cup.

== Early life ==
His father is a Turkish Cypriot who came to England as a small boy, and his mother is English. His younger brother, Kemal, also became a professional footballer. According to Kemal, their father pushed both him and Muzzy into becoming footballers, due to his passion of the sport.

== Club career ==
=== Leicester City ===
Izzet signed as a schoolboy for Chelsea, but never made a first team appearance during three years at the London club. He moved to Leicester City in March 1996 on loan for the rest of the season. He became a regular in the side, scoring one goal. When Leicester beat Crystal Palace in the play-offs, Izzet was able to make his move permanent for a fee of £800,000. He kept his place in the side for their Premier League season, which was successful for City. They came 9th in the Premier League, and won the League Cup. Izzet formed a partnership in midfield with Neil Lennon, which proved vital for Leicester.

In the 1998–99 season, Leicester came 10th in league, and reaching the League Cup final again, but lost out to Tottenham Hotspur. The following season, Leicester came 8th, and again got to the League Cup Final, this time coming up against Tranmere Rovers, of Division One. This year they won 2–1, with Matt Elliott getting both goals. Izzet had been a regular in the side through all of this time. After Martin O'Neill left to become manager of Scottish club Celtic, Izzet remained a Leicester player. His time at Leicester attracted interest from West Ham and Middlesbrough, but he did not leave the club.

"I love this place – it's just a shame that we couldn't stay up because you never know, I might have been here for longer."

— Izzet on Leicester City's relegation from the Premier League in the 2003–04 season.

Despite pledging to stay at Leicester prior to the start of the 2001-02 season, Izzet submitted a transfer request in the autumn of 2001. However, he rejected a move to Middlesbrough as he did not want to be seen to be "jumping ship". He issued a plea to Martin O'Neill to sign him in May 2002, remarking that "only an idiot wouldn't consider joining Celtic."

Following Leicester's relegation and with the club in administration, Izzet was again linked with Middlesbrough. However, Leicester insisted they would not accept a reduced offer for Izzet, who was valued at £6 million. He withdrew his transfer request in March 2003, with the club securing promotion to the Premier League a month later on 19 April. In January 2004, Leicester rejected £500,000 bids from Aston Villa and Blackburn Rovers for Izzet. Leicester were relegated at the end of the 2003–04 season. Unable to afford Izzet's £30,000 per week wages, the club admitted he was leaving. Izzet was Leicester's standout player during the season, assisting 14 of the club's 48 goals, or 29% of goals scored by the club.

=== Birmingham City ===
Izzet joined Birmingham City in June 2004 on a free transfer, signing a three-year deal. He scored his only goal for Birmingham in September; an equaliser against Bolton Wanderers. The following match, Izzet suffered a knee injury following a challenge from Newcastle United's Olivier Bernard on 3 October 2004. This injury plagued the remainder of Izzet's season and he was able to make only two further appearances. The knee problems continued into the following season and he featured sporadically throughout his time at the club, until he was forced to announce his retirement from football in June 2006.

=== Thurmaston Town ===
On 28 November 2009, Izzet made a shock last minute return to Saturday football with Leicestershire Senior League side Thurmaston Town. However, he admitted days later that his knee was still very sore and was quoted saying "whether I can turn out for Thurmaston every week is another thing." He never played for them again.

== International career ==
Izzet qualified for the Turkey national side through his Turkish-Cypriot father. He was included in the Turkey squad for Euro 2000, making his debut and sole appearance in the tournament in the group stage as Turkey drew 0–0 with Sweden. He was also part of the squad for the 2002 World Cup, featuring again just once, as a substitute in the 1–0 semi-final defeat to Brazil.

In total, Izzet made nine appearances for the national side.

== Later career ==
Izzet now runs a football academy with fellow former professional footballer and former Leicester teammate Steve Walsh. In September 2015 Izzet's autobiography was published, titled Muzzy: My Story. The autobiography was co-written with Leicester Mercury writer Lee Marlow.

Izzet is an ambassador for Dorothy Goodman School, a Special Educational Needs school in Hinckley, Leicestershire.

== Career statistics ==
=== International ===
Appearances and goals by national team and year
National team	Year	Apps	Goals
Turkey	2000	4	0
Turkey	2001	0	0
Turkey	2002	4	0
Turkey	2003	0	0
Turkey	2004	1	0
Total		9	0

== Honours ==
Leicester City

- Football League First Division play-offs: 1996
- Football League Cup: 1996–97, 1999–2000; runner-up: 1998–99

Turkey

- FIFA World Cup third place: 2002

Individual

- Premier League Player of the Month: September 1999
- Most assists in the Premier League: 2003–04
- PFA Team of the Year: 2002–03 First Division

Order

- Turkish State Medal of Distinguished Service
