= King Power Stadium =

Football stadium in Leicester, England

Coordinates: 52°37′13″N 1°08′32″W

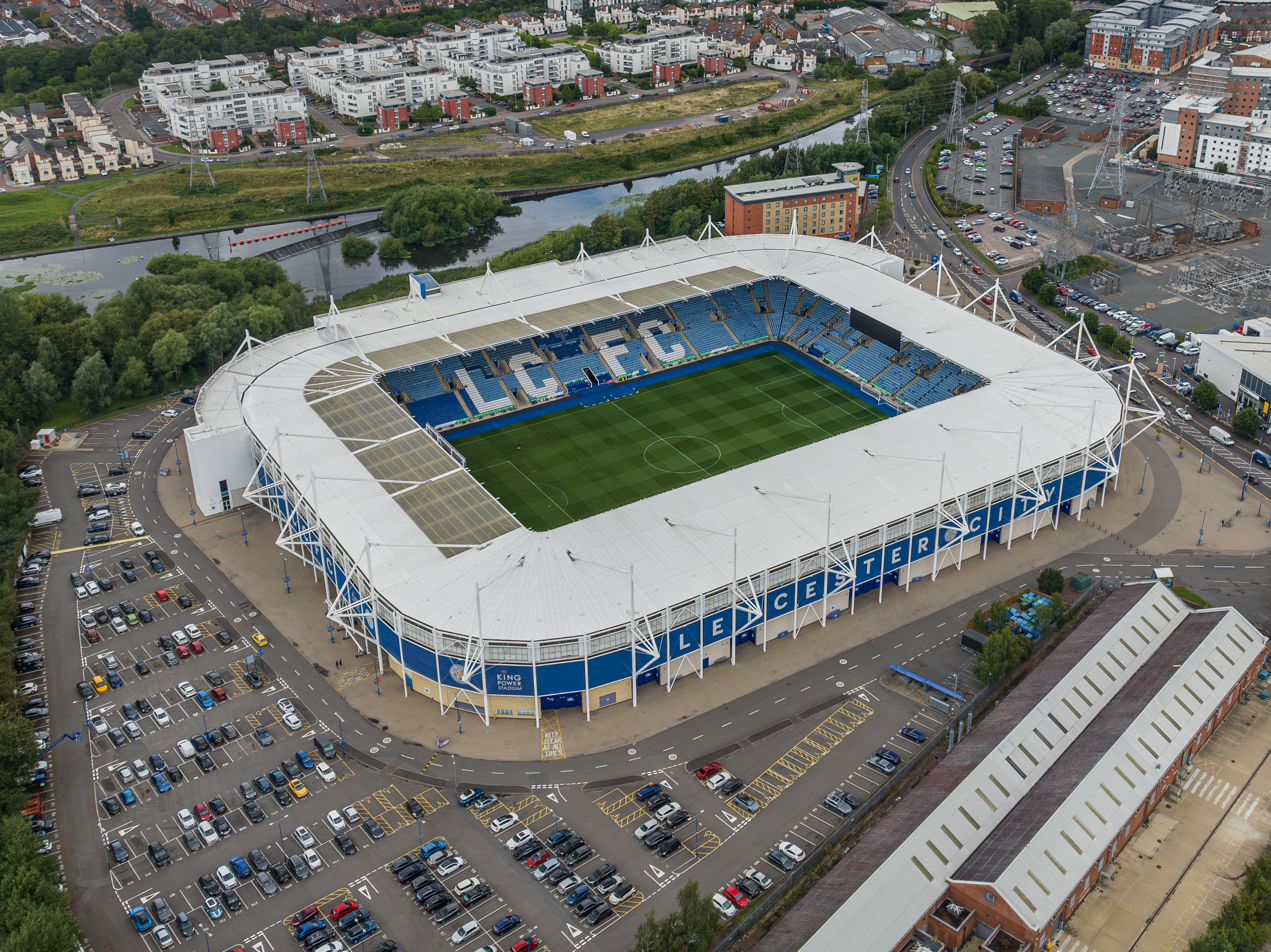
- UEFA
- Interactive map of King Power Stadium
- Full name: King Power Stadium
- Former names: Walkers Stadium (2002–2011)
- Address: Filbert Way
- Location: Leicester; England; LE2 7FL
- Owner: King Power
- Capacity: 32,259
- Surface: Desso GrassMaster
- Record attendance: Football: 32,241 (Leicester City vs Sunderland, 8 August 2015); Rugby: 32,500 (Leicester Tigers vs Bath, 1 April 2006); Concerts: 54,000 (Kasabian, 28–29 May 2016)
- Field size: 105 by 68 metres (114.8 yd × 74.4 yd)
- Public transit: Leicester

Construction
- Groundbreaking: 2000
- Built: 2001–2002
- Opened: 23 July 2002; 24 years ago
- Cost: £35-£37 million
- Architect: The Miller Partnership

Tenants
- Leicester City (2002–present); Leicester City Women (2021–present)

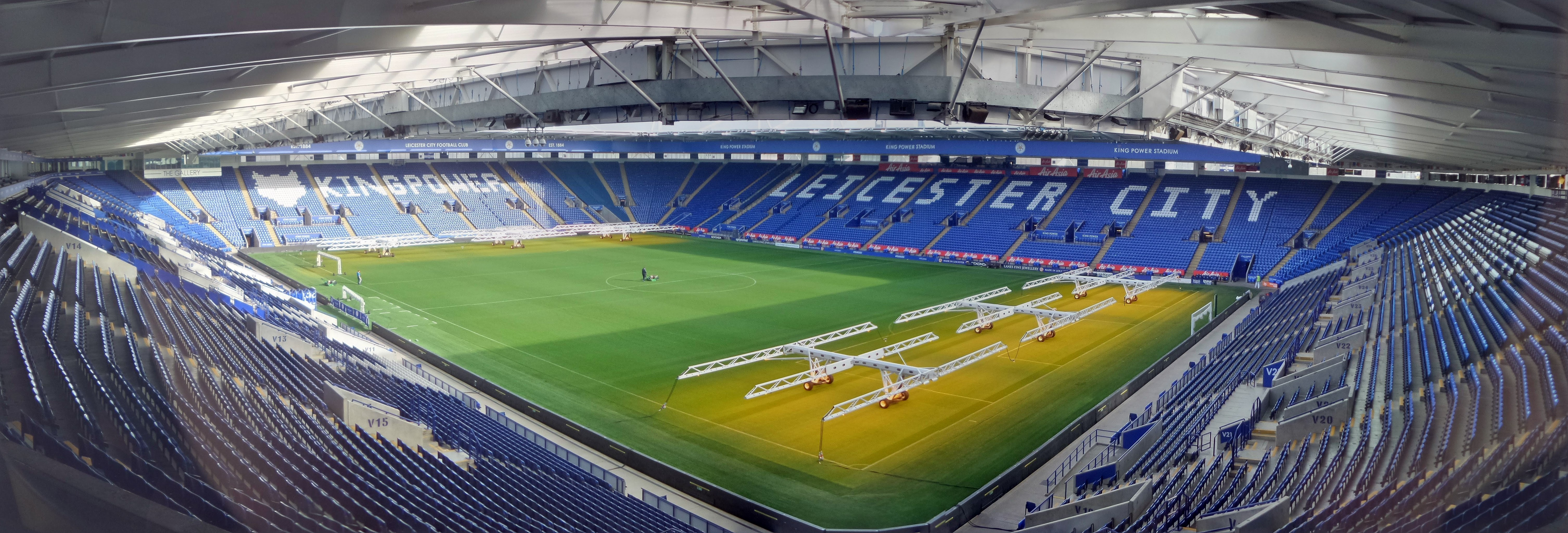
The stadium from the south-west corner.

King Power Stadium is a football stadium located in the city of Leicester, East Midlands, England, and the home of Leicester City. The stadium opened in 2002 as the Walkers Stadium and has a capacity of 32,259. The club attracted worldwide attention when they lifted the Premier League title on the site in 2016.

== History ==
=== Background and construction ===
Leicester City's previous stadium was at nearby Filbert Street from 1891 to 2002, located less than 300 yards away from the current site.

Filbert Street was gradually upgraded during the 20th century and with the advent of the Taylor Report in January 1990 requiring all clubs in the top two divisions to have all-seater stadiums by August 1994, Leicester's directors began to investigate building a new stadium soon after the Taylor Report recommendations were announced, but decided to take the redevelopment option by building a new stand on one side of Filbert Street and fitting seats into the remaining standing areas, giving the stadium a 21,500 all-seated capacity by the 1994–95 season.

Filbert Street's conversion to an all-seater stadium coincided with their promotion to the Premier League after a seven-year exile, and with their subsequent relegation after just one season, it appeared the 21,500 capacity would be adequate. However, success in the late 1990s saw crowds rise, which meant virtually every game at Filbert Street was a sell-out by the end of the decade. Relocation was soon back on the cards; several clubs had relocated to new stadiums around this time, including fellow Midlands clubs Stoke City and Derby County.

Some parts of the ground – the East and North Stands in particular – were also somewhat outdated, which led the manager, Martin O'Neill to joke that when he showed Filbert Street to new signings he led them backwards out of the players tunnel to prevent them from seeing the East Stand.

In early 1998, plans were announced for a 40,000 all-seater stadium to be built at Bede Island South in time for the 2000–01 season, but they were abandoned on 5 January 2000. Chairman John Elsom vowed other options, including relocation to another site or even further redevelopment of Filbert Street, would be considered, hoping either option would have materialised by August 2002.

The relocation option was soon settled upon, as plans were unveiled on 2 November 2000 for a 32,000-seat stadium in the Freeman's Wharf area, situated alongside the River Soar. The stadium was expected to be completed in time for the 2003–04 season, although it was suggested at the time relocation could happen at the start of the 2002–03 season. Work on the stadium began in the summer of 2001, and by 10 October that year it was confirmed the new stadium would be ready for the 2002–03 season. The stadium was completed on time in the summer of 2002, ready for Leicester to take up residence for the start of the 2002–03 season.

The stadium cost £35-37 million to build. Designed by architects The Miller Partnership, it was constructed by Birse Stadia (the specialist stadium division of Birse Construction). After becoming official contractors, Martin Peat, managing director of Birse Building said: "We are delighted to have been selected by Leicester City Football Club as construction partners for their new stadium which, when completed, will be one of the finest in Europe." The club's chief executive Steve Kind described the stadium as a "flagship development, not just for the club but for the community and city of Leicester as a whole."

As well as being a venue for football, the stadium was originally branded as The Midlands Conference Centre, offering a "state of the art conference, banqueting and catering facility unparalleled in the East Midlands." At the time of building, two large dual-purpose concourses, which could be used as exhibition centres on non-matchdays, were a first in British stadium design.

=== Financial controversy ===
The cost of the new stadium, combined with relegation from the Premiership, the collapse of the English transfer market due to the introduction of the transfer window, and the collapse of ITV Digital, meant Leicester went into receivership shortly after moving to the new stadium.

As a result, local businesses involved in the stadium project were impacted financially, and Leicester were unable to pay the full amount owed to Birse Construction, who had built the stadium for £35-37 million less than three months earlier. Birse Construction therefore lost a large part of their fee and withdrew from any future football ground construction. The club did however pay the stadium's overall project manager, DTZ, in full.

Leicester ended the 2002–03 season with promotion back to the Premier League (then known as the FA Barclaycard Premiership), despite spending the early part of the season in receivership due to their huge debts, until a takeover deal was completed.

=== Opening ===
The stadium was officially opened by former Leicester striker Gary Lineker on 23 July 2002. He used a giant pair of scissors to cut a ribbon on the pitch after arriving at the stadium in a Walkers lorry. The first match at the new stadium was a friendly against Basque team Athletic Bilbao, on 4 August 2002. The match finished 1–1, with Tiko scoring the first goal at the stadium, and Jordan Stewart scoring Leicester's first goal. The attendance was approximately 24,000 (no official figure was recorded due to a computer problem).

Manager Micky Adams described the stadium in the club's pre-match programme: “I am sure everyone will agree our new home is pretty special. Spectacular, I’d call it. Fantastic seems to be the word used by most people to describe the surroundings and the facilities. It’s certainly a stadium befitting the 21st century." The first competitive match took place six days later and Leicester won 2–0 against Watford in front of a near-capacity crowd of 31,022. Brian Deane scored both goals, including the stadium's first in competitive games.

=== Ownership ===
The deal which brought the club out of receivership meant the stadium's ownership reverted to American academic retirement fund TIAA–CREF, who had supplied £28 million via a bond scheme towards the stadium's construction, with the club taking a long-term lease while the bond repayments were made.

On 1 March 2013, owners King Power purchased the stadium for £17 million through their company K Power Holdings Co, Ltd. Upon completing the purchase of the stadium, vice-chairman Aiyawatt Srivaddhanaprabha said "Our plan is to bring long-term sustainable success to Leicester City Football Club. Purchasing the stadium was always a key element in this plan. Whilst there are no immediate plans to alter the structure or design of the stadium site, the increased flexibility through direct ownership ensures that the football club can freely adjust to the changing needs of its supporter-base for the future."

=== Development and other stadium works ===
In June 2015, vice-chairman Aiyawatt Srivaddhanaprabha stated publicly for the first time that plans were in place to increase the stadium's capacity to around 42,000.

During the off-season between May 2016 and August 2016, all seats inside the stadium were specially treated for the first time to restore their original colour.

In April 2018, it was announced that initial planning for the expansion and development of King Power Stadium was underway.

In October 2018, two new screens were installed at either end of the stadium.

On 28 July 2021, Leicester City confirmed that they would reveal plans to the public which included increasing the capacity to 40,000, as well as several development projects in the area surrounding the stadium.

The club announced on 25 October 2021 that they had submitted a hybrid planning application to Leicester City Council for the redevelopment of King Power Stadium and the surrounding area. They had also applied for permits in September 2021 to begin early enabling works in preparation for the redevelopment.

In August 2022, the stadium became the first in Europe to operate a frictionless kiosk for food and drink purchases.

In September 2022, plans were provisionally approved for the expansion of King Power Stadium's capacity to 40,000. The other development projects were also given provisional approval.

On 14 December 2023, the club announced that they had received formal approval from Leicester City Council to begin development works, following initial approval in September 2022.

During the off-season between May 2025 and August 2025, 5,610 seats were equipped with safe standing rails (17.4% of the stadium's total capacity).

=== Helicopter crash ===
On 27 October 2018, a Leonardo AW169 helicopter carrying club chairman Vichai Srivaddhanaprabha and four others crashed in a car park outside the stadium. The crash happened shortly after the helicopter took off from the pitch, and there were no survivors on board. On the one-year anniversary of the tragedy (27 October 2019), The Vichai Srivaddhanaprabha Memorial Garden was opened. Three years later, on what would have been the late chairman's 64th birthday (4 April 2022), The Khun Vichai Srivaddhanaprabha Statue was unveiled.

== Transport links ==
The stadium is situated approximately 1.2 miles from Leicester Train Station and 22 miles from East Midlands Airport. By car, junction 21 of the M1 and M69 motorways, a major arterial route into both the city centre and stadium, is within a 4.0 mile radius. Bus services operate daily between the city centre (around 2.0 miles away) and in close proximity to the stadium. The club encourages locals to utilise the free cycle park on matchdays, which is situated on the stadium site. Leicester also has three Park & Ride sites, which run from 7am until 7pm Monday to Saturday, with free parking at each location.

== Naming ==
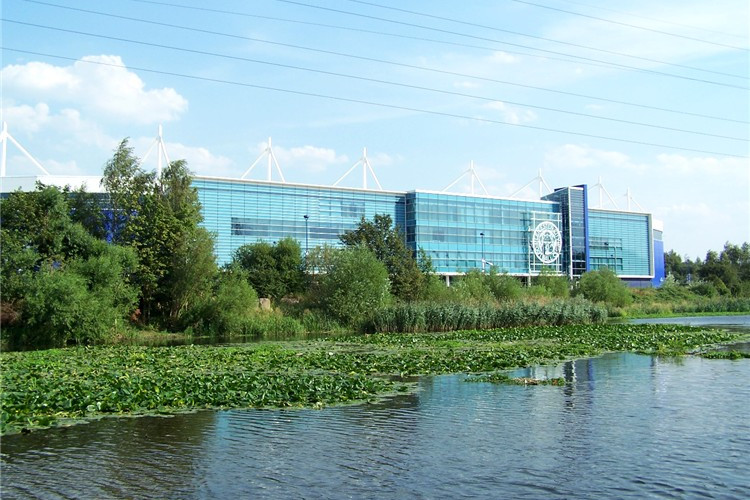
The stadium from the River Soar, facing towards the West Stand.

In 2002, former Leicester City shirt sponsors Walkers signed a ten-year deal for naming rights. The stadium was originally to have been called the "Walkers Bowl", but the name was dropped after fans objected on the grounds the name was too "American" (referring to the American college football bowl game concept). As a result of a fans' petition, the name was quickly changed to the "Walkers Stadium". However, some fans at the time were still unhappy that the name only referenced the sponsor, with no reference to Leicester City. The agreement for naming rights was superseded halfway through the ten-year period, in May 2007, when Walkers again paid a seven-figure sum to extend their sponsorship of the stadium until 2017. On 5 July 2011, naming rights were sold to King Power, who became owners of the club in August 2010. Despite the name change, the biggest suite inside the stadium still carries the name of the Walkers Hall.

Since opening in 2002, the stands inside the stadium have had various names, but all four are currently unsponsored and titled the North, East, South (Spion Kop) and West respectively. The North Stand was originally called the Lineker Stand, after former player Gary Lineker, and the South Stand was originally named the Fosse Stand, after the club's founding name Leicester Fosse. In addition to the Lineker Stand, there are also two lounges inside the stadium named after two other former notable players, Gordon Banks and Keith Weller. The stadium is often referred to as Filbert Way after the site's address, which retains a link with the club's former home ground Filbert Street. It is also referred to as Freeman's Wharf, after the area in which the stadium is situated. During the 2015 Rugby World Cup, the stadium was known as the Leicester City Stadium and this is the same for UEFA competitions.

== Notable matches and events ==
Since opening in 2002, the stadium has hosted international football, rugby matches, boxing events, and a major concert over two nights.

=== Men's football ===
The first game at the stadium was a friendly against Spanish team Athletic Bilbao, on 4 August 2002. The game finished 1–1, with Tiko scoring the first goal at the stadium, and Jordan Stewart scoring Leicester's first goal.

During their absence from Wembley, the England national football team played a home friendly game against Serbia and Montenegro at the stadium on 3 June 2003. Goals from Steven Gerrard and Joe Cole gave England a 2–1 victory. On 12 October of the same year, the ground hosted an international friendly match between Brazil and Jamaica, with Roberto Carlos scoring the winner.

On 20 May 2006, the stadium hosted the Football Conference play-off final between Hereford United and Halifax Town. A goal in extra time gave Hereford a 3–2 win and promotion to the Football League. Nine days later, the ground was also the venue for another international friendly, with Ghana beating Jamaica 4–1.

On 12 October 2007, it hosted the 2009 UEFA European Under-21 Championship qualification Group 3 match between England's under-21s and Montenegro's under-21s. The hosts edged out the visitors 1–0 with Matt Derbyshire's goal.

On 26 April 2008, Leicester City played Sheffield Wednesday in their last home game of the 2007–08 Championship season. The match was played in front of a crowd of 31,892 supporters, which was the largest home attendance in the league on the day, and Leicester's highest home attendance of the season. The match finished 1–3 to Sheffield Wednesday, and following a 0–0 draw away at Stoke City on 4 May 2008, Leicester were relegated to League One, the third tier of English football, for the first time in their history. Prior to this season, Leicester were one of nine clubs to have never competed outside of England's top two divisions.

On 30 July 2011, Leicester City played a strong Real Madrid side in the Npower Cup in front of 32,188 fans, with star players such as Cristiano Ronaldo and Kaká playing for Madrid. After falling behind to a first-half goal from José Callejón, and a second on the hour from Karim Benzema, Sven-Göran Eriksson's men pulled a goal back a minute from the end through substitute Lloyd Dyer.

On 4 April 2014, Leicester won 2–1 against Sheffield Wednesday. The win put them on the brink of promotion back to the Premier League after 10 years, and on the following day, the club's Premier League status was confirmed as results went in their favour.

On 3 May 2014, Leicester lifted the 2013–14 Championship title at home to Doncaster Rovers. This was the club's 7th second tier title.

On 21 September 2014, Leicester went on to produce one of the greatest comebacks in Premier League history, as they won 5–3 against Manchester United. They came back from 3–1 down with 30 minutes left to score four goals.

On 8 August 2015, the stadium recorded its current highest ever league attendance of 32,242. Leicester won 4–2 against Sunderland in their first match of the 2015–16 Premier League season.

On 27 February 2016, Leicester scored an 89th minute goal to defeat Norwich City 1–0 in the 2015–16 Premier League. This resulted in the first ever "football earthquake" recorded in the UK, after a nearby seismometer measured a 0.3 magnitude tremor.

On 7 May 2016, Leicester City lifted the 2015–16 Premier League trophy following a 3–1 win over Everton, less than a week after officially becoming champions as Tottenham Hotspur failed to beat Chelsea. Andrea Bocelli performed live before the match.

On 28 May 2016 and 29 May 2016, rock band Kasabian performed over two nights in front of over 50,000 fans. These were the first-ever major concerts held at the stadium.

On 27 September 2016, the stadium hosted its first ever competitive European football match since opening in 2002. Leicester won 1–0 against Porto in the UEFA Champions League.

On 14 March 2017, at the stadium the club played its UEFA Champions League last-16 second leg fixture against Sevilla. The match finished 2–0 on the night, and 3–2 on aggregate which resulted in Leicester reaching the quarter-finals of the competition.

On 11 September 2018, the stadium hosted a friendly between the England national team and Switzerland. England won 1–0 with a goal from Marcus Rashford. Leicester left-back Ben Chilwell made his England debut as a 79th-minute substitute at his home stadium.

On 30 July 2022, the stadium hosted the FA Community Shield due to Wembley hosting the final of UEFA Women's Euro 2022 on the following day. As the holders, Leicester City were invited to host. This made Leicester the only club to host this fixture at two different stadia, following Filbert Street in 1971.

On 25 March 2023, the stadium hosted its fourth England international match to date. England U21s played against France U21s in a friendly.

On 4 May 2024, the club lifted the 2023–24 Championship title at home to Blackburn Rovers. This was Leicester's eighth second tier title.

From 28 February 2025 to 1 March 2025, the Labour Party held their regional East Midlands conference at the stadium.

==== International matches ====
3 June 2003 Friendly	England	2–1	Serbia and Montenegro	Leicester
20:00 BST	Gerrard 35'; J. Cole 82'		Jestrović 45'	Stadium: Walkers Stadium; Attendance: 30,900; Referee: Paul Allaerts

12 October 2003 Friendly	Jamaica	0–1	Brazil	Leicester
15:00 BST			Roberto Carlos 15'	Stadium: Walkers Stadium; Attendance: 32,000; Referee: Rob Styles

29 May 2006 Friendly	Jamaica	1–4	Ghana	Leicester
	Euell 58'		Muntari 5'; Stewart 19' (o.g.); Appiah 66'; Amoah 68'	Stadium: Walkers Stadium; Attendance: 32,000

11 September 2018 Friendly	England	1–0	Switzerland	Leicester
20:00 BST	Rashford 54'			Stadium: King Power Stadium; Attendance: 30,256; Referee: Clément Turpin

=== Rugby matches ===
In 2004, Leicester Tigers considered sharing the stadium with Leicester City as their own 16,815-capacity ground at Welford Road was considered too small to handle the growing popularity of rugby union. The plan would have seen the two clubs form a jointly owned company to buy the stadium from, then owners, Teachers (TIAA–CREF). The deal was abandoned in 2005 as the two respective parties were unable to fully agree terms.

Due to the continued parlous state of the football club's finances, rumours that groundsharing was still being discussed continued to circulate, with some suggestions Tigers were considering buying the stadium outright from Teachers (TIAA–CREF). In 2007, a permanent groundshare was ruled out as Leicester Tigers received planning consent for a major expansion of their own Welford Road venue, with a new 10,500-seat stand taking Welford Road to a capacity of 24,500.

Leicester Tigers played six matches at the stadium in total. The first three were either to capitalise on the larger capacity with the greater interest in high-profile games, or when competition rules demanded the match be played away from their normal home ground. The other three matches were played due to the demolition of the old Caterpillar Stand at Welford Road.

Date	Competition	Opponents	Result
24 April 2005	2004–05 Heineken Cup Semi-final	Toulouse	19 – 27
1 April 2006	2005–06 Heineken Cup Quarter-final	Bath	12 – 15
21 April 2007	2006–07 Heineken Cup Semi-final	Llanelli Scarlets	33 – 17
11 April 2009	2008–09 Heineken Cup Quarter-final	Bath	20 – 15
25 April 2009	2008–09 Guinness Premiership, Round 22	Bristol	73 – 3
9 May 2009	2008–09 Guinness Premiership Semi-final	Bath	24 – 10

The stadium has additionally hosted international rugby, including a match between a World XV and South Africa on 3 December 2006 to mark the centenary of the Springboks' first game abroad. South Africa won 32–7. The site also hosted matches during the 2015 Rugby World Cup, which included three pool matches: Argentina–Tonga, Argentina–Namibia and Canada–Romania.

Date	Stage of Tournament	Team 1	Score	Team 2	Attendance
4 October 2015	Pool C	Argentina	45 – 16	Tonga	29,124
6 October 2015	Pool D	Canada	15 – 17	Romania	27,153
11 October 2015	Pool C	Argentina	64 – 19	Namibia	30,198

== Average league and record attendances ==
The overall record attendance at the stadium is thought to be between 32,488 and 32,500, for a rugby union match between Leicester Tigers and Bath in 2006. This rugby match took place prior to seats being removed to provide segregation of rival football fans, reducing the capacity of the ground from exactly 32,500 to 32,261.

=== Leicester City Men ===
The current highest ever league attendance at the stadium is 32,242, which was for a Premier League match against Sunderland on 8 August 2015. The highest ever attendance for a non-competitive football match at the stadium is 32,188, which was for a pre-season friendly against Real Madrid on 30 July 2011. The lowest average league attendance at the stadium is 20,254 during the club's first ever season in League One in 2008–09.

Season	League	Capacity	Attendance	% Full
2002–03	First Division	32,261	29,230	91%
2003–04	Premier League	32,261	30,983	96%
2004–05	Championship	32,261	24,137	75%
2005–06	Championship	32,261	22,234	69%
2006–07	Championship	32,261	23,206	72%
2007–08	Championship	32,261	23,509	73%
2008–09	League One	32,261	20,254	63%
2009–10	Championship	32,261	24,542	76%
2010–11	Championship	32,261	23,666	73%
2011–12	Championship	32,261	23,037	71%
2012–13	Championship	32,261	22,283	69%
2013–14	Championship	32,261	24,990	77%
2014–15	Premier League	32,261	31,693	98%
2015–16	Premier League	32,261	32,014	99%
2016–17	Premier League	32,261	31,886	99%
2017–18	Premier League	32,261	31,559	98%
2018–19	Premier League	32,261	31,895	99%
2019–20	Premier League	32,261	32,039	99%
2020–21	Premier League	32,261	8,000 (Note: Attendances restricted due to the COVID-19 pandemic)	25%
2021–22	Premier League	32,261	31,983	99%
2022–23	Premier League	32,261	31,772	98%
2023–24	Championship	32,261	31,238	97%
2024–25	Premier League	32,261	31,448	97%
2025–26	Championship	32,261	28,907	90%

=== Leicester City Women ===
Since 2021, the stadium has been the primary home of Leicester City Women.

Season	League	Capacity	Attendance	% Full
2021–22	Women's Super League	32,261	2,446	8%
2022–23	Women's Super League	32,261	3,027	9%

== See also ==
- List of stadiums in the United Kingdom by capacity
- Lists of stadiums
