= Michael Price (footballer, born 1983) =

English footballer

Personal information
- Date of birth: 4 March 1983 (age 43)
- Place of birth: Ashington, England
- Position: Goalkeeper

Youth career
- Leicester City

Senior career*
Years	Team	Apps	(Gls)
2000–2003	Leicester City	0	(0)
2003	→ Boston United (loan)	0	(0)
2003–2005	Darlington	36	(0)
2005–2006	Harrogate Town		
2006	Gateshead	8	(0)
- * Club domestic league appearances and goals

Michael Price (born 4 March 1983) is an English professional footballer who played as a goalkeeper.

== Career ==
Price began his career with Leicester City, but his contract was not renewed through his latter term and undertook a month's loan at Boston United in February 2003. Price then featured in Darlington's pre-season fixtures of 2003, earning him a short-term contract and kept a clean sheet in each of his first three of his 39 League and League Cup appearances for the Quakers. He was nonetheless allowed to move to Harrogate Town in 2005, joining Gateshead a year later in 2006, only to be hit with a serious injury after only eight games. He later represented Bridlington Town.
