= Nikos Dabizas =

Greek former professional footballer

Personal information
- Full name: Nikolaos Dabizas
- Date of birth: 3 August 1973 (age 53)
- Place of birth: Amyntaio, Greece
- Height: 1.88 m (6 ft 2 in)
- Position: Centre-back

Youth career
- Pontioi Veria

Senior career*
Years	Team	Apps	(Gls)
1991–1994	Pontioi Veria	85	(7)
1994–1998	Olympiacos	104	(8)
1998–2003	Newcastle United	130	(11)
2003–2005	Leicester City	51	(1)
2005–2011	AEL	144	(4)
Total		514	(31)

International career
1994–2004	Greece	70	(0)
Medal record
Men's football
Representing Greece
UEFA European Championship
Winner	2004
World Military Cup
Winner	1997
- * Club domestic league appearances and goals

Nikos Dabizas (Greek: Νίκος Νταμπίζας, born 3 August 1973) is a Greek former professional footballer who played as a defender for Newcastle United, Leicester City, Olympiacos and AEL. He was also in Greece's 2004 European Football Championship winning squad.

== Playing career ==
=== Pontioi Veria ===
Dabizas spent his days playing football and helping in his father's company. His first contact with football came when he was sixteen, although he never dreamt of becoming a professional footballer. However, fate had other plans for him. He played for a year as an amateur at the local team of Amyntaio called Ermis, which was enough to give him the ticket to a team in the third division and a professional contract, as he joined Pontioi Veria, as an 18-year-old, where he remained for three consecutive seasons, playing one year on the third division and two in the second. His big career break came when he was 21. He got an offer from Olympiacos, one of the biggest teams in Greece.

=== Olympiacos ===
He moved to Piraeus and helped his new team win the Greek championship twice, something they hadn't done in ten years. He also took part in his first UEFA Champions League games. After three and a half seasons with Olympiacos he received an offer from Newcastle United, which opened him the doors to the English football fields, in the Premier League.

=== Newcastle United ===
In March 1998, Dabizas signed with Newcastle United for a fee of £2 million. His initial four-year contract, which was to expire in 2002, was renewed well ahead of time, and was to see Dabizas in the team, until June 2004. He famously scored Newcastle's winning goal in the 1–0 away victory in the Tyne–Wear derby against Sunderland at the Stadium of Light on 24 February 2002. Whilst at Newcastle United, he played in both the 1998 and 1999 FA Cup Finals.

Being left out of the first squad since the spring of 2003, Dabizas had no option, but to seek a transfer. A car accident prevented him from moving during the summer transfer window. Still, the decision to move was enforced, as he did not see any action when the new season started. He accepted an offer from Leicester City in January 2004.

=== Leicester City and Euro 2004 ===
Dabizas played regularly for Leicester as they battled to stay in the Premier League, their efforts were inadequate and the team was relegated to the Championship. It seemed like it was going to turn out to be a very disappointing season, but it was far from over. Dabizas was selected for the 2004 European Football Championship Greek squad but never saw any action as an injury kept him on the sidelines. To everyone's surprise, Greece went on to win the tournament, ending a season that had many turning points. After Euro 2004, Dabizas chose to stay at Leicester despite being entitled to a relegation release clause in his contract. Dabizas scored twice during his spell at Leicester, one in the league against Sheffield United, and another in the FA Cup against Charlton Athletic.

=== AEL ===
Dabizas was released by Leicester at the end of his contract in May 2005. In August 2005, he signed a three-year deal with AEL. In 2007, he won Larissa's second Greek cup, after a great personal performance in the final, being the captain. Dabizas, playing in UEFA Cup, reaching the group stage by eliminating Blackburn Rovers. In 2008–09 season, the team finished 5th in Super League and won an UEFA Europa League place, but were eliminated in the second qualifying round by KR Reykjavík (1–1,0–2). Here, Dabizas found Stelios Venetidis and Stelios Giannakopoulos two teammates in the Greece national team for UEFA Euro 2004, as well as former Newcastle United teammate Laurent Robert. After a poor start to the 2009–10 season, Larissa finally finished in mid-table, and Dabizas signed a one-year contract extension, meaning that his spell with Larissa would be the longest with any club in his career and also where he played most. He announced his retirement in 2011.

== Managerial career ==
=== Panathinaikos ===
Dabizas joined Panathinaikos on 17 May 2013 as the club's football director until 11 November 2014, and he returned in this position on 17 May 2018 until 18 October 2019.

=== Omonia ===
Dabizas joined Cypriot club Omonia on 30 March 2016 as football director.

== Honours ==
Olympiacos

- Alpha Ethniki: 1996–97, 1997–98

Newcastle United

- FA Cup runner-up: 1997–98, 1998–99

AEL

- Greek Cup: 2006–07

Greece

- UEFA European Championship: 2004
