= Martin Reeves =

English footballer

Personal information
- Full name: Martin Lee Reeves
- Date of birth: 7 September 1981 (age 45)
- Place of birth: Birmingham, England
- Position: Midfielder

Team information
- Current team: Brackley Town

Senior career*
Years	Team	Apps	(Gls)
2001–2003	Leicester City	8	(0)
2003	→ Hull City (loan)	8	(1)
2003–2005	Northampton Town	15	(0)
2005	Aldershot Town	1	(0)
2005–2006	Nuneaton Borough		
2006–2007	Hucknall Town		
2007–	Brackley Town		
- * Club domestic league appearances and goals

Martin Reeves (born 7 September 1981) is an English former football midfielder who last played for Brackley Town.
