= Jon Stevenson =

English footballer (born 1982)

Personal information
- Full name: Jonathan Stevenson
- Date of birth: 13 October 1982 (age 44)
- Place of birth: Leicester, England
- Position: Forward

Team information
- Current team: Melton Town (player-manager)

Senior career*
Years	Team	Apps	(Gls)
2000–2003	Leicester City	12	(2)
2003–2004	Swindon Town	5	(0)
2004–2005	Cambridge City	23	(7)
2005–2006	Alfreton Town	35	(11)
2006–2007	Tamworth	26	(1)
2007	Hinckley United	6	(2)
2007–2008	Boston United	33	(9)
2008	Corby Town	11	(0)
2008	Quorn	1	(1)
2008–2009	Halesowen Town	1	(0)
2009–2010	Rothwell Town		
2010	Hinckley United		
2010–2011	Thurmaston Town		
2011–2015	Oadby Town	71	(53)
2015	Shepshed Dynamo		
2016–2017	AFC Rushden & Diamonds	20	(5)
2017–2018	Gresley		
2018	Oadby Town		
2018–	Melton Town		

Managerial career
- 2018–: Melton Town
- * Club domestic league appearances and goals as of 00:00. 29 July 2019 (UTC)

Jonathan Stevenson (born 13 October 1982) is an English football player-manager of Leicestershire Senior League Premier Division side Melton Town. as a player, he plays as a forward.

== Playing career ==
Born in Leicester, Leicestershire, Stevenson started his career with home town side Leicester City as a trainee. Stevenson did not start a game for the club, making only 12 appearances in the league, all coming on as a substitute. His debut came against West Ham United in a FA Premier League match on 12 January 2002. He went on to score only two goals for the club; one against Aston Villa in a 2–2 draw, and the solitary goal in a 6–1 defeat at the hands of Ipswich Town.

After being released by Leicester City in June 2003, he was snapped up by Swindon Town. At Swindon he made just eight appearances, four as a substitute.

After failing to make his mark, Stevenson was signed by Cambridge City before moving on to Conference North club Alfreton Town.

After a year at Alfreton, Stevenson joined Tamworth, where he signed a 12-month deal on 18 May 2006.

On 28 June 2007, local newspaper the Tamworth Herald confirmed that Tamworth manager Gary Mills had said that Stevenson had not been offered a new deal at the club and was unlikely to receive one. Stevenson had a trial with Conference North side Hinckley United and signed for the club in July 2007.

It was confirmed on 14 September 2007 that Stevenson had left Hinckley for Conference North rivals Boston United. Stevenson began his tenure at Boston by scoring in all his first three matches. However, he departed at the end of the season.

Between 2008 and 2011. Stevenson then spent time playing for teams across the Midlands region, including Corby Town in Northamptonshire, Quorn, Halesowen Town in the West Midlands, Rothwell Town, Hinckley United and Thurmaston Town.

Between 2011 and 2015, Stevenson played for South Leicestershire side Oadby Town.

== Managerial career ==
=== Melton Town ===
Stevenson, along with Tom Manship were named as player managers for Melton Town on 17 May 2018.
