= Tom Williamson (English footballer) =

English footballer

Personal information
- Full name: Thomas Williamson
- Date of birth: 24 December 1984 (age 41)
- Place of birth: Leicester, England
- Position: Midfielder

Team information
- Current team: Pittwater Pelicans
- Number: 9

Youth career
- Leicester City

Senior career*
Years	Team	Apps	(Gls)
2002–2004	Leicester City	1	(0)
2004–2005	Canvey Island	12	(0)
2005–2007	Grays Athletic	32	(1)
2007–2008	Bishop's Stortford		
2008–2011	Basingstoke Town		
- * Club domestic league appearances and goals as of 12:40, 29 July 2008 (UTC)

Thomas Williamson (born 24 December 1984) is an English footballer who played in the Premier League for Leicester City.

Released by Leicester in 2004, he spent a year at Canvey Island and two at Grays Athletic before his contract was terminated by mutual consent on 3 August 2007. He joined Bishop's Stortford for the 2007–08 season.

In July 2008, Williamson signed for Basingstoke Town.

== Honours ==
Grays Athletic

- FA Trophy: 2005–06
