= Trevor Benjamin =

English footballer (born 1979)

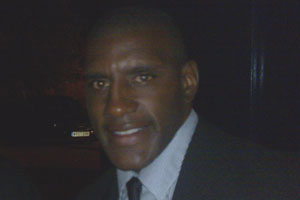
- Benjamin in 2009

Personal information
- Full name: Trevor Junior Benjamin
- Date of birth: 8 February 1979 (age 47)
- Place of birth: Kettering, England
- Height: 6 ft 2 in (1.88 m)
- Position: Forward

Senior career*
Years	Team	Apps	(Gls)
1995–2000	Cambridge United	123	(37)
2000–2005	Leicester City	81	(15)
2001–2002	→ Crystal Palace (loan)	6	(1)
2002	→ Norwich City (loan)	6	(0)
2002	→ West Bromwich Albion (loan)	3	(1)
2003	→ Gillingham (loan)	4	(1)
2003–2004	→ Rushden & Diamonds (loan)	6	(1)
2004	→ Brighton & Hove Albion (loan)	10	(5)
2004–2005	→ Northampton Town (loan)	4	(2)
2005	Northampton Town	1	(0)
2005	Coventry City	12	(1)
2005–2007	Peterborough United	47	(8)
2005	→ Watford (loan)	2	(0)
2006	→ Swindon Town (loan)	8	(2)
2007	→ Boston United (loan)	3	(0)
2007	→ Walsall (loan)	8	(4)
2007–2008	Hereford United	34	(12)
2008	Gainsborough Trinity	3	(0)
2008	Northwich Victoria	2	(0)
2008	Hednesford Town	1	(0)
2008–2009	Wellingborough Town	2	(1)
2009	Kidsgrove Athletic	12	(3)
2009	Tamworth	4	(1)
2009	Harrogate Town	5	(3)
2009	Woking	2	(0)
2010	Sunshine George Cross	0	(0)
2010	Bedlington Terriers	2	(1)
2010	→ Wroxham (loan)	3	(0)
2010	→ Morpeth Town (loan)	2	(0)
2010–2011	Morpeth Town	2	(0)
2012	Seaton Delaval		
Total		398+	(99+)

International career
2001	England U21	1	(0)
2002	Jamaica	2	(0)

Managerial career
- 2010–2011: Morpeth Town
- * Club domestic league appearances and goals

Trevor Junior Benjamin (born 8 February 1979) is a former professional footballer and manager who played as a forward.

He is an example of a journeyman footballer, having represented 29 teams in his career, and making over 350 appearances in the Football League between 1995 and 2008. He also holds the record for the most league clubs played for, which is 16. He most notably spent time in the Premier League with Leicester City, who he joined in 2000 from Cambridge United. He was capped by England U21 but went on to feature for Jamaica as a full international, where he earned two caps. Benjamin has also played as a professional in the Football League for Crystal Palace, Norwich City, West Bromwich Albion, Gillingham, Rushden & Diamonds, Brighton & Hove Albion, Northampton Town, Coventry City, Peterborough United, Watford, Swindon Town, Boston United, Walsall and Hereford United.

At the age of 28, Benjamin dropped out of the professional game and firstly signed for Conference North side Gainsborough Trinity. He went on to play for Northwich Victoria, Hednesford Town, Wellingborough Town, Kidsgrove Athletic, Tamworth, Harrogate Town and Woking. In 2010, he briefly joined Australian semi-pro side Sunshine George Cross, but failed to make an appearance and returned the English Non-League football where he went on to feature for Bedlington Terriers, Wroxham and Morpeth Town. Having initially been on loan at Morpeth from Bedlington, he was later appointed player-manager of the club in November 2010 and managed the club until the end of the 2010–11 season.

== Playing career ==
=== Cambridge United ===
Benjamin grew up in Wellingborough, Northamptonshire, supporting Arsenal with Ian Wright as his idol. His first club was Wellingborough Colts where he excelled as a striker, gaining representative honours with Northamptonshire. His potential was recognised and he played a friendly for Kettering Town, with his brother Richard. Trevor played in their youth team then started scoring regularly for the reserves.

He then signed as a trainee for Cambridge United where he made his professional début as a 16-year-old, against Gillingham in a 0–0 draw, during his time there he scored 46 goals in 146 appearances. He also scored both goals (one in the first leg and one in the second leg) as Third Division Cambridge knocked Premier League Sheffield Wednesday out of the League Cup 2–1 on aggregate in September 1998. He also scored as Cambridge knocked second tier Crystal Palace out of the FA Cup in December 1999.

=== Leicester City ===
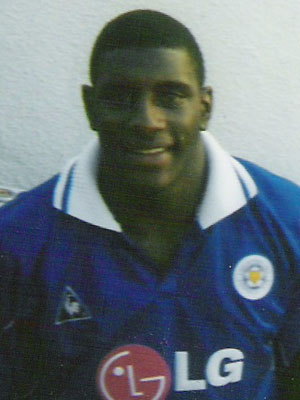
Benjamin during his time at Leicester City.

Following some impressive displays for Cambridge United, Benjamin signed for Leicester City (where his work rate and goal celebrations saw him become something of a cult figure). He was signed for a fee of £1.3 million by manager Peter Taylor, who snapped up Benjamin as a replacement for the departed Emile Heskey who had joined Liverpool.

He made his debut for Leicester City, as a substitute, in a 0–0 draw with Sunderland, on 1 October 2000. He scored his first goal for the club in a 3–0 win at Middlesbrough on 18 November 2000, however this proved to be his only goal that season.

Benjamin then went on loan to three clubs in the 2001–02 season. His first loan spell was at Crystal Palace, where he scored once against Bradford City in six league appearances. He then joined Norwich City making six appearances again before joining West Bromwich Albion, where he scored on his debut against Barnsley and helped them get promoted to the Premier League. Benjamin spent the whole of the 2002–03 season back at Leicester. His next loan spell was at Gillingham in September 2003, where he scored on his debut against West Ham United. In November 2003 he was loaned out to Rushden & Diamonds, scoring once against Port Vale. His next loan was at Brighton & Hove Albion in January 2004. At Brighton he scored five goals in ten league appearances and manager Mark McGhee was keen to extend his loan to the end of the season. However he returned to his parent club in March 2004 and Brighton were promoted in his absence. In January 2005 new Leicester City manager Craig Levein made the decision to cancel Benjamin's contract.

=== Northampton Town and Coventry City ===
Benjamin joined Northampton Town permanently on 19 January 2005, after a few weeks on loan to the club. Trevor was later signed up by Coventry manager Micky Adams (under whom he had played at Leicester) until the end of the season, scoring once against Watford.

=== Peterborough United and Hereford United ===
In the summer of 2005 Benjamin was released again and later signed for Peterborough United on a three-year deal, stating his main motivation was to gain first team football. Benjamin later made loan appearances for Watford, Swindon Town, Boston United and Walsall. Benjamin went on to sign for Hereford United on 1 August 2007. He made his début for the club in a 0–0 draw against Rotherham United on 11 August 2007. His first goal followed a week later, from the penalty spot, in a 2–1 win away at Barnet. He continued his impressive form in the first half of the season and became something of a fans favourite at Edgar Street, scoring his share of goals. However he did not start another match for the Bulls after the defeat to Cardiff at the end of January, which coincided with the arrival of Gary Hooper on loan.

=== Non-league ===
On 19 May 2008, Benjamin was released from Hereford United, being told his services will not be needed in the following season, despite being the club's third top goalscorer that season. He joined Conference North club Gainsborough Trinity on non-contract terms in August 2008, a week later after joining Gainsborough Trinity, the Lincolnshire Echo revealed the player had also been training with Cheltenham Town. Despite this Trevor was released by a 'disappointed' Steve Charles after just three appearances for Gainsborough Trinity, with the Blues noting that the Jamaican International had under performed in his games.

Benjamin had trials with Cheltenham Town, Gillingham and AFC Bournemouth at the start of the 2008–09 season, but failed to earn a contract at any of the three clubs. Bournemouth manager Jimmy Quinn said of the player, "He's not what I'm looking for, he's probably past his sell-by date." On 10 October 2008, Benjamin signed for Northwich Victoria, but was released three weeks later as part of cost-cutting measures. He then made one appearance at Hednesford Town in the Northern Premier League Premier Division, after a few games for the club he was released. A couple of weeks later, Benjamin moved further down the non-league ladder to sign for his home town club Wellingborough Town in the United Counties Football League. He scored on his debut in the 2–2 Boxing Day draw with Raunds Town. Recent speculations have linked him, like in the summer of 2008, to Chester City.

However, Benjamin moved on to Kidsgrove Athletic in the Northern Premier League Division One South, making his debut in a 5–2 win against Brigg Town on 14 February 2009. He made 12 league appearances during the 2008–09 season, and another two appearances in the Staffordshire Senior Cup, helping them win the final on 22 April 2009. But Benjamin has recently stated that he would like a return to league football after fully recovering from his eye infection. He is currently on trial with Rushden & Diamonds in a bid to earn a contract for the new season. On 7 August 2009, Trevor Benjamin signed for Conference National newcomers Tamworth, following a successful trial period with the club.

He made his debut the following day in a Conference National away fixture against Stevenage Borough, Benjamin came on as a 79th-minute substitute for midfielder Tom Shaw. The game finished in a 1–1 draw. He moved on to Harrogate Town in the Conference North, making his debut and scoring two goals in a 3–2 loss against Northwich Victoria on 3 October 2009. In his second appearance, against Droylsden, he scored again with a stunning free-kick in the last few minutes of the game. He departed in November after his rolling month-to-month contract was not renewed.

He made his debut for Woking in a 6–0 win against St Albans City in the FA Trophy competition, on 21 November 2009. After another two games for the Cards, he was released prior to 5 December 2009 match against Bishop's Stortford. He joined Bedlington Terriers in Northern League Division One on a free transfer in February 2010. The next month he joined Wroxham in Eastern Counties League Premier Division for a short loan spell.

In September 2010 he was loaned out again, to Terrier's local rivals Morpeth Town. After two goalless appearances, the 3–0 home defeat by Marske United and the 2–1 away defeat by Newton Aycliffe, he was appointed the club's player-manager following the departure of previous manager Tom Wade. Shortly after his release he signed for Seaton Delaval Amateurs.

== International career ==
Benjamin was selected for the England under-21s, making his only appearance as a substitute against Mexico at Filbert Street on 24 May 2001.

He made his international début for Jamaica on 20 November 2002 against Nigeria, in Lagos.

== Personal life ==
After retiring from competitive football Benjamin has launched his own brand of goalkeeping gloves called Locust UK. All of Benjamin's sons are following in their fathers footsteps, including Zac who had a short spell at Premier League club Burnley and is currently playing for semi-professional club Alnwick FC. His son Theo signed for Newcastle United Academy during the 2023/24 season, and his other son, Cruz, is part of the Bedlington Terriers youth setup.

== Career statistics ==
Appearances and goals by club, season and competition
Club	League	Season	League		FA Cup		League Cup		FL Trophy		Total	
Club	League	Season	Apps	Goals	Apps	Goals	Apps	Goals	Apps	Goals	Apps	Goals
Cambridge United	Division Three	1995–96	5	0	0	0	0	0	0	0	5	0
Cambridge United	Division Three	1996–97	7	1	0	0	1	0	0	0	8	1
Cambridge United	Division Three	1997–98	25	4	3	1	2	0	0	0	30	5
Cambridge United	Division Three	1998–99	42	10	2	1	5	4	3	2	52	17
Cambridge United	Division Two	1999–00	44	20	5	3	2	0	0	0	51	23
Cambridge United	Total		123	35	10	5	9	4	3	2	146	46
Leicester City	Premier League	2000–01	21	1	3	0	1	0	—		25	1
Leicester City	Premier League	2001–02	11	0	0	0	1	0	—		12	0
Leicester City	Division One	2002–03	35	8	1	0	3	1	—		39	9
Leicester City	Premier League	2003–04	4	0	0	0	0	0	—		4	0
Leicester City	Championship	2004–05	10	2	0	0	0	0	—		10	2
Leicester City	Total		81	11	4	0	5	1	0	0	90	12
Crystal Palace (loan)	Division One	2001–02	6	1	0	0	0	0	—		6	1
Norwich City (loan)	Division One	2001–02	6	0	0	0	0	0	—		6	0
West Bromwich Albion (loan)	Division One	2001–02	3	1	0	0	0	0	—		3	1
Gillingham (loan)	Division One	2003–04	4	1	0	0	0	0	—		4	1
Rushden & Diamonds (loan)	Division Two	2003–04	6	1	0	0	0	0	0	0	6	1
Brighton & Hove Albion (loan)	Division Two	2003–04	10	5	0	0	0	0	0	0	10	5
Northampton Town (loan)	League Two	2004–05	5	2	0	0	0	0	0	0	5	2
Coventry City	Championship	2004–05	12	1	0	0	0	0	—		12	1
Peterborough United	League Two	2005–06	20	1	2	1	0	0	2	1	24	3
Peterborough United	League Two	2006–07	27	7	3	0	2	2	1	0	33	9
Peterborough United	Total		47	8	5	1	2	2	3	1	57	12
Watford (loan)	Championship	2005–06	2	0	0	0	0	0	—		2	0
Swindon Town (loan)	League One	2005–06	8	2	0	0	0	0	0	0	8	2
Boston United (loan)	League Two	2006–07	3	0	0	0	0	0	0	0	3	0
Walsall (loan)	League Two	2006–07	8	2	0	0	0	0	0	0	8	2
Hereford United	League Two	2007–08	34	10	6	1	2	0	1	0	43	11
Gainsborough Trinity	Conference North	2008–09	3	0	0	0	—		—		3	0
Northwich Victoria	Conference	2008–09	2	0	1	0	—		—		3	0
Hednesford Town	NPL Premier	2008–09	1	0	0	0	—		—		1	0
Wellingborough Town	UCL Premier	2008–09	2	1	0	0	—		—		2	1
Kidsgrove Athletic	NPL South	2008–09	12	3	0	0	—		—		12	3
Tamworth	Conference	2009–10	4	1	0	0	—		—		4	1
Harrogate Town	Conference North	2009–10	5	3	0	0	—		—		5	3
Woking	Conference South	2009–10	2	0	0	0	—		—		2	0
Bedlington Terriers	NL Division One	2009–10	1	1	0	0	—		—		1	1
Bedlington Terriers	NL Division One	2010–11	1	0	0	0	—		—		1	0
Bedlington Terriers	Total		2	1	0	0	0	0	0	0	2	1
Wroxham (loan)	ECL Premier	2009–10	3	0	0	0	—		—		3	0
Morpeth Town (loan)	NL Division Two	2010–11	2	0	0	0	—		—		2	0
Career totals			396	89	26	7	19	7	7	3	448	106
