= 2000–01 Wycombe Wanderers F.C. season =

Wycombe Wanderers
2000–01 season
- Chairman: Ivor Beeks
- Manager: Lawrie Sanchez
- Stadium: Adams Park
- Second Division: 13th
- FA Cup: Semi-finals
- League Cup: Second round
- Football League Trophy: Area quarter-finals
- Top goalscorer: League: Andy Rammell (10); All: Andy Rammell (13)
- Average home league attendance: 5,549

During the 2000–01 English football season, Wycombe Wanderers competed in the Football League Second Division.

== Season summary ==
Having barely escaped relegation the previous season, this time round Wycombe achieved survival in the Second Division by a comfortable margin. Their defensive record, the best of any team outside the top six, ensured they finished well clear of relegation in 13th place. Wycombe enjoyed their greatest success in the FA Cup, defeating First Division teams Grimsby Town, Wolverhampton Wanderers and Wimbledon before edging Premier League side Leicester City 2–1 at Filbert Street; this result caused Leicester, then sitting fourth in the Premier League, to enter a poor run of form that dragged them down to 13th. The win at Leicester set up a dream semi-final tie against Liverpool at Villa Park – Wycombe pushed Gérard Houllier's men all the way before losing 2–1; Liverpool would go on to finish third in the Premier League and win a treble of the League, FA and UEFA Cups.

== Final league table ==
Pos	Team	Pld	W	D	L	GF	GA	GD	Pts
11	Port Vale	46	16	14	16	55	49	+6	62
12	Peterborough United	46	15	14	17	61	66	−5	59
13	Wycombe Wanderers	46	15	14	17	46	53	−7	59
14	Brentford	46	14	17	15	56	70	−14	59
15	Oldham Athletic	46	15	13	18	53	65	−12	58

Rules for classification: 1) Points; 2) Goal difference; 3) Goals scored

== Results ==
Wycombe Wanderers' score comes first

=== Legend ===
Win	Draw	Loss

=== FA Cup ===
Round	Date	Opponent	Venue	Result	Attendance	Goalscorers
R1	18 November 2000	Harrow Borough	H	3–0	2,681	Bates (2), Simpson
R2	10 December 2000	Millwall	A	0–0	7,819	
R2R	19 December 2000	Millwall	H	2–1	3,878	Rammell, McCarthy
R3	6 January 2001	Grimsby Town	H	1–1	5,390	McCarthy
R3R	16 January 2001	Grimsby Town	A	3–1	3,269	McCarthy, Simpson, Rogers
R4	27 January 2001	Wolverhampton Wanderers	H	2–1	9,617	Rammell, Parkin
R5	17 February 2001	Wimbledon	H	2–2	9,650	Simpson, Brown
R5R	20 February 2001	Wimbledon	A	2–2 (won 8–7 on pens)	9,464	Carroll, McCarthy
QF	10 March 2001	Leicester City	A	2–1	21,969	McCarthy, Essandoh
SF	8 April 2001	Liverpool	N	1–2	40,037	Ryan

=== League Cup ===
Round	Date	Opponent	Venue	Result	Attendance	Goalscorers
R1 1st Leg	22 August 2000	Barnet	A	1–2	1,741	Rogers
R1 2nd Leg	5 September 2000	Barnet	H	3–1 (won 4–3 on agg)	2,205	McSporran, Castledine, McCarthy
R2 1st Leg	19 September 2000	Birmingham City	H	3–4	2,537	Rammell, Baird, Bates
R2 2nd Leg	26 September 2000	Birmingham City	A	0–1 (lost 3–5 on agg)	8,960	

== Squad ==
Note: Flags indicate national team as defined under FIFA eligibility rules; some limited exceptions apply. Players may hold more than one non-FIFA nationality.

No.	Pos.	Nation	Player
1	GK	(England) ENG	Martin Taylor
2	DF	(England) ENG	Chris Marsh
3	DF	(England) ENG	Chris Vinnicombe
4	DF	(England) ENG	Jason Cousins
5	DF	(Republic of Ireland) IRL	Paul McCarthy
6	DF	(England) ENG	Jamie Bates
7	MF	(Scotland) SCO	Dave Carroll
8	MF	(England) ENG	Keith Ryan
9	FW	(Scotland) SCO	Andrew Baird
10	FW	(England) ENG	Sean Devine
11	MF	(England) ENG	Paul Emblen
12	MF	(England) ENG	Peter Holsgrove
14	MF	(Republic of Ireland) IRL	Maurice Harkin
15	FW	(England) ENG	Jermaine McSporran
16	FW	(England) ENG	Andy Rammell
17	DF	(Canada) CAN	Mark Rogers
18	DF	(England) ENG	Ben Townsend

No.	Pos.	Nation	Player
19	MF	(England) ENG	Stewart Castledine
20	FW	(England) ENG	George Clegg (on loan from Manchester United)
21	DF	(England) ENG	Alan Beeton
22	MF	(England) ENG	Dannie Bulman
23	MF	(Republic of Ireland) IRL	Ian Simpemba
24	FW	(England) ENG	Guy Whittingham
25	MF	(England) ENG	Martyn Lee
26	GK	(England) ENG	Mark Osborn
27	FW	(England) ENG	Leeyon Phelan
28	MF	(England) ENG	Michael Simpson
29	FW	(England) ENG	Danny Senda
30	FW	(England) ENG	Steve Brown
32	DF	(England) ENG	John Nutter
33	FW	(England) ENG	Matthew Brady
34	DF	(England) ENG	Roger Johnson
35	GK	(England) ENG	Mark Westhead
36	FW	(Northern Ireland) NIR	Roy Essandoh

=== Left club during season ===
Note: Flags indicate national team as defined under FIFA eligibility rules; some limited exceptions apply. Players may hold more than one non-FIFA nationality.

No.	Pos.	Nation	Player
20	FW	(England) ENG	Steve Jones (on loan from Bristol City)
20	FW	(Canada) CAN	Niall Thompson (released)

No.	Pos.	Nation	Player
24	FW	(England) ENG	Sam Parkin (on loan from Chelsea)
