= 1999–2000 Wycombe Wanderers F.C. season =

Wycombe Wanderers
1999–2000 season
- Manager: Lawrie Sanchez
- Football League Second Division: 12th
- FA Cup: Second round
- League Cup: Second round
- Football League Trophy: Second round
- Top goalscorer: Sean Devine (25)

During the 1999–2000 English football season, Wycombe Wanderers F.C. competed in the Football League Second Division where they finished in 12th position.

== Season summary ==
Wycombe Wanderers competed in the Football League Second Division during the 1999–2000 season, with Lawrie Sanchez continuing as manager. The club had finished 19th in the division the previous season, and the campaign represented an improvement in their league position. Wycombe ultimately finished 12th, recording 16 wins, 13 draws and 17 defeats from their 46 league matches. They scored 56 goals and conceded 53, finishing on 61 points, level with Luton Town but above them on goal difference.

Wycombe began the league campaign with a 1–1 draw against Burnley at Adams Park, before recording their first victory away to Scunthorpe United. Further draws against Preston North End and Gillingham were followed by a home defeat to Wrexham. The team subsequently put together a period of improved form, including a 3–1 home victory over Cardiff City, a 2–1 win at Blackpool and a 5–3 victory over Reading at Adams Park. The Reading match saw Sean Devine score a hat-trick, while Keith Ryan and Dave Carroll also scored. Devine subsequently scored the only goal against Cambridge United in the following league match.

The middle part of the league season was more inconsistent. Wycombe suffered defeats against Notts County, Blackpool, Wigan Athletic and Stoke City, while also drawing with Luton Town, Oldham Athletic and Bristol Rovers. A 2–0 victory over Brentford in November, with both goals scored by Devine, was followed by defeats against Burnley and Millwall. Wycombe then went unbeaten in their final two league matches of 1999, drawing 0–0 with Bristol City and defeating Bournemouth 2–1.

The second half of the league campaign continued to alternate between victories, draws and defeats. Wycombe recorded notable wins over Chesterfield, Scunthorpe United and Colchester United, while also drawing with Millwall, Oldham Athletic and Stoke City. In April, Wycombe defeated Chesterfield 2–1, Colchester United 3–0 and Notts County 2–0. The final league match of the season brought a 2–1 away victory over Cambridge United, with Andy Baird and Jermaine McSporran scoring. Wycombe therefore ended the campaign in 12th place, comfortably clear of the relegation places but outside the promotion and play-off positions.

=== Cup competitions ===
Wycombe's League Cup campaign began with a two-legged first-round tie against Wolverhampton Wanderers. After losing the first leg 1–0 at Adams Park, Wycombe produced a 4–2 victory at Molineux, with two goals from McSporran and one each from Mark Muscat (an own goal) and Ryan. The result put Wycombe through to the second round on a 4–3 aggregate score.

In the second round, Wycombe faced West Bromwich Albion. The first leg at The Hawthorns ended 1–1, with John McCarthy scoring for Wycombe. The return at Adams Park was a high-scoring encounter which West Bromwich Albion won 4–3 after extra time. Devine scored early in the match, while Carroll and Steve Brown also scored for Wycombe. The 5–4 aggregate defeat brought the club's League Cup run to an end.

The 1999–2000 FA Cup produced an unusual series of matches. Wycombe were drawn against Oxford City in the first round and drew 1–1 at Adams Park, with Michael Simpson scoring. The replay at Oxford City's ground was abandoned after extra time because of a fire at the stadium, with the score again 1–1. A further replay was subsequently played, with Wycombe winning 1–0 through a goal from Brown to progress to the second round.

In the second round, Wycombe were drawn against Wigan Athletic. The match at Adams Park ended 2–2, with Devine and Ryan scoring for Wycombe. In the replay at JJB Stadium, Wigan won 2–1, with Baird scoring Wycombe's goal. Wycombe were therefore eliminated in the second round of the competition.

Wycombe also entered the Football League Trophy at the second-round stage. They drew 1–1 away to Oxford United, with McSporran scoring for Wycombe. Oxford United subsequently won the penalty shoot-out 5–3, ending Wycombe's involvement in the competition.

=== Players ===
Devine was Wycombe's leading goalscorer during the season, scoring 23 goals in the league and 25 in all competitions. His league total included a hat-trick against Reading and two goals in the home victory over Brentford. McSporran was another significant contributor, scoring 12 goals in all competitions, while Ryan and Baird also provided goals throughout the campaign.

Devine's 25 goals made him the club's leading scorer in all competitions, while the team's overall total of 56 league goals was accompanied by 53 conceded. The campaign consequently ended with Wycombe in the upper half of the Second Division without securing a promotion play-off place.

The season was followed by the 2000–01 campaign, in which Wycombe again finished in the middle of the Second Division but reached the FA Cup semi-finals for the first time in the club's history.

== Final league table ==
Pos	Team	Pld	W	D	L	GF	GA	GD	Pts
10	Reading	46	16	14	16	57	63	−6	62
11	Wrexham	46	17	11	18	52	61	−9	62
12	Wycombe Wanderers	46	16	13	17	56	53	+3	61
13	Luton Town	46	17	10	19	61	65	−4	61
14	Oldham Athletic	46	16	12	18	50	55	−5	60

Rules for classification: 1) Points; 2) Goal difference; 3) Goals scored

== Results ==
Wycombe's score comes first

=== Legend ===
Win	Draw	Loss

=== Football League Division Two ===
Match	Date	Opponent	Venue	Result	Attendance	Scorers
1	7 August 1999	Burnley	H	1–1	6,119	McSporran 27'
2	14 August 1999	Scunthorpe United	A	1–0	4,092	Devine 42'
3	21 August 1999	Preston North End	H	1–1	5,091	Devine 28'
4	28 August 1999	Gillingham	A	2–2	6,180	Brown 34', McCarthy 80'
5	31 August 1999	Wrexham	H	0–1	5,393	
6	4 September 1999	Oxford United	A	0–0	6,306	
7	11 September 1999	Cardiff City	H	3–1	4,982	Lawrence 18', McSporran 75', Baird 79'
8	18 September 1999	Bury	A	0–2	3,293	
9	25 September 1999	Blackpool	A	2–1	3,452	McSporran 38', Devine 40'
10	2 October 1999	Reading	H	5–3	7,042	Ryan 8', Carroll 45', Devine 52', 69', 83'
11	9 October 1999	Cambridge United	H	1–0	5,345	Devine 7'
12	16 October 1999	Notts County	A	1–2	5,710	Devine 20'
13	19 October 1999	Luton Town	A	1–1	5,820	Jason Cousins 25'
14	23 October 1999	Blackpool	H	0–2	5,021	
15	2 November 1999	Oldham Athletic	A	2–2	3,807	Devine 2', Baird 88'
16	6 November 1999	Bristol Rovers	H	1–1	5,167	Devine 67'
17	12 November 1999	Wigan Athletic	A	1–2	5,523	McSporran 26'
18	23 November 1999	Stoke City	H	0–4	4,345	
19	27 November 1999	Brentford	H	2–0	5,879	Devine 44', 59'
20	4 December 1999	Burnley	A	0–1	9,149	
21	11 December 1999	Millwall	H	1–2	4,777	Ryan 62'
22	17 December 1999	Bristol City	A	0–0	8,175	
23	26 December 1999	Bournemouth	H	2–1	5,656	Brown 26', Devine 55'
24	3 January 2000	Chesterfield	H	3–0	5,001	Devine 40', 59', Bulman 90'
25	8 January 2000	Millwall	A	1–1	8,945	Devine 13'
26	15 January 2000	Scunthorpe United	H	2–1	4,850	Bates 30', Ryan 58'
27	18 January 2000	Colchester United	A	0–1	4,075	
28	22 January 2000	Preston North End	A	2–3	10,969	Brady 5', Lawrence 57'
29	5 February 2000	Wrexham	A	3–1	2,781	Brady 54', Carroll 77', Senda 90'
30	12 February 2000	Oxford United	H	0–1	6,200	
31	19 February 2000	Brentford	A	0–0	5,981	
32	26 February 2000	Bury	H	3–0	4,909	Devine 40', 57', 85'
33	3 March 2000	Cardiff City	A	2–2	5,011	McSporran 18', Devine 55'
34	7 March 2000	Bristol Rovers	A	0–1	8,053	
35	11 March 2000	Oldham Athletic	H	0–0	4,471	
36	18 March 2000	Stoke City	A	1–1	9,738	McSporran 23'
37	21 March 2000	Wigan Athletic	H	0–2	3,821	
38	25 March 2000	Bournemouth	A	0–2	4,398	
39	28 March 2000	Gillingham	H	1–0	4,183	Baird 88'
40	1 April 2000	Bristol City	H	1–2	4,754	Devine 63'
41	8 April 2000	Chesterfield	A	2–1	2,081	Ryan 51', Devine 76'
42	15 April 2000	Colchester United	H	3–0	4,558	Ryan 62', 67', Steve Brown 90'
43	21 April 2000	Notts County	H	2–0	4,369	Devine 40', McSporran 77'
44	24 April 2000	Reading	A	1–2	11,834	McSporran 64'
45	29 April 2000	Luton Town	H	0–1	5,379	
46	6 May 2000	Cambridge United	A	2–1	5,335	Baird 35', McSporran 86'

=== FA Cup ===
Round	Date	Opponent	Venue	Result	Attendance	Scorers
R1	30 October 1999	Oxford City	H	1–1	2,963	Simpson 67'
R1 Replay	9 November 1999	Oxford City	A	A – A		Simpson 59'
R1 Replay	16 November 1999	Oxford City	A	1–0	4,004	Brown 51'
R2	20 November 1999	Wigan Athletic	H	2–2	2,992	Devine 20', Ryan 90'
R2 Replay	30 November 1999	Wigan Athletic	A	1–2	3,967	Baird 23'

=== League Cup ===
Round	Date	Opponent	Venue	Result	Attendance	Scorers
R1 1st Leg	10 August 1999	Wolverhampton Wanderers	H	0–1	4,564	
R1 2nd Leg	24 August 1999	Wolverhampton Wanderers	A	4–2	13,732	Muscat (o.g.) 11', McSporran 26', 59', Ryan 85'
R2 1st Leg	14 September 1999	West Bromwich Albion	A	1–1	9,383	McCarthy 58'
R2 2nd Leg	21 September 1999	West Bromwich Albion	H	3–4	5,047	Devine 4', Carroll 70', Brown 119'

=== League Trophy ===
Round	Date	Opponent	Venue	Result	Attendance	Scorers
R2	11 January 2000	Oxford United	A	1–1 (3–5 pens)	1,798	McSporran 40'

== Squad ==
Appearances for competitive matches only

Pos.	Name	League		FA Cup		League Cup		Football League Trophy		Total	
Pos.	Name	Apps	Goals	Apps	Goals	Apps	Goals	Apps	Goals	Apps	Goals
DF	(England) Gary Ablett	4	0	0	0	0	0	0	0	4	0
FW	(Scotland) Andy Baird	20(10)	4	3	1	1(2)	0	1	0	25(12)	5
DF	(England) Jaime Bates	30(2)	1	5	0	4	0	0	0	39(2)	1
DF	(England) Alan Beeton	10(6)	0	4	0	2(1)	0	0	0	16(7)	0
DF	(England) Matthew Brady	4(3)	2	4	0	0	0	0(1)	0	4(4)	2
MF	(England) Steve Brown	34(5)	3	3(2)	1	3	1	1	0	41(7)	5
MF	(England) Dannie Bulman	10(19)	1	0(2)	0	0	0	1	0	11(21)	1
GK	(England) Stephen Bywater	2	0	0	0	0	0	0	0	2	0
MF	(England) Dave Carroll	36	2	3	0	3(1)	1	0	0	42(1)	3
DF	(England) Jason Cousins	30(7)	1	3(1)	0	2(1)	0	0	0	35(9)	1
FW	(England) Sean Devine	39	23	5	1	4	1	0	0	48	25
MF	(England) Paul Emblen	12(4)	0	1(3)	0	1(3)	0	0	0	14(10)	0
MF	(Northern Ireland) Mo Harkin	2(15)	0	1(2)	0	0	0	0	0	3(17)	0
DF	(England) Lee Holsgrove	5(4)	0	0	0	2	0	0	0	7(4)	0
DF	(England) Matthew Lawrence	29	2	4	0	4	0	1	0	38	2
MF	(England) Martyn Lee	3(1)	0	0	0	0	0	0	0	3(1)	0
DF	(Republic of Ireland) Paul McCarthy	21(1)	1	0	0	2	1	1	0	24(1)	1
DF	(England) Jermaine McSporran	32(6)	9	4(1)	0	4	2	1	1	41(7)	12
GK	(England) Mark Osborn	1	0	0	0	0(1)	0	0	0	1(1)	0
DF	(Canada) Mark Rogers	19(6)	0	4	0	0	0	1	0	24(6)	0
MF	(England) Keith Ryan	38	6	4	1	4	1	0	0	46	8
DF	(England) Danny Senda	5(21)	1	0	0	0	0	0(1)	0	5(22)	1
MF	(England) Michael Simpson	42(1)	0	5	2	3(1)	0	1	0	51(2)	2
GK	(England) Martin Taylor	42	0	5	0	3	0	1	0	51	0
MF	(England) Richard Thompson	1(5)	0	0	0	0	0	0(1)	0	1(6)	0
DF	(England) Ben Townsend	1	0	0	0	0	0	0	0	1	0
DF	(England) Chris Vinnicombe	33(2)	0	1	0	1	0	1	0	36(2)	0
GK	(England) Mark Westhead	1(1)	0	0	0	1	0	0	0	2(1)	0

== See also ==
- 1999–2000 in English football
