= 1996–97 Wycombe Wanderers F.C. season =

Wycombe Wanderers
1996–97 season
- Chairman: Ivor Beeks
- Manager: Alan Smith (until 30 September); Neil Smillie (caretaker 30 September - 22 October); John Gregory (from 22 October)
- Stadium: Adams Park
- Second Division: 18th
- FA Cup: Third round
- League Cup: Second round
- Football League Trophy: First round
- Top goalscorer: League: Carroll/McGavin (9); All: Carroll/McGavin (10)
- Average home league attendance: 5,232

During the 1996–97 English football season, Wycombe Wanderers F.C. competed in the Football League Second Division.

== Season summary ==
In the 1996–97 season, a poor start to the season for Wycombe saw Smith sacked after alienating himself from the Chairboys' fanbase in the process with what were perceived to be negative long-ball tactics. In September, with the club bottom of the league, John Gregory took over as Wycombe manager and turned their fortunes around and saved them from relegation.

== Final league table ==
Pos	Team	Pld	W	D	L	GF	GA	GD	Pts
16	Bournemouth	46	15	15	16	43	45	−2	60
17	Bristol Rovers	46	15	11	20	47	50	−3	56
18	Wycombe Wanderers	46	15	10	21	51	56	−5	55
19	Plymouth Argyle	46	12	18	16	47	58	−11	54
20	York City	46	13	13	20	47	68	−21	52

Rules for classification: In the Football League goals scored (GF) takes precedence over goal difference (GD).

== Results ==
Wycombe Wanderers' score comes first

=== Legend ===
Win	Draw	Loss

=== Football League Second Division ===
Date	Opponent	Venue	Result	Attendance	Scorers
18 August 1996	Shrewsbury Town	A	1–1	3,440	Brown
24 August 1996	Gillingham	H	1–1	4,582	Carroll
27 August 1996	Bury	H	0–1	3,563	
31 August 1996	Blackpool	A	0–0	4,856	
7 September 1996	Luton Town	H	0–1	6,471	
10 September 1996	Walsall	A	2–2	2,659	Evans, de Souza
14 September 1996	Burnley	A	1–2	9,379	de Souza
21 September 1996	Brentford	H	0–1	5,330	
28 September 1996	Peterborough United	A	3–6	5,580	Mahoney-Johnson (2), Carroll
1 October 1996	Rotherham United	H	4–2	3,438	Lawrence, McGavin (2), Williams
5 October 1996	Notts County	H	1–0	4,506	McGavin
12 October 1996	Bournemouth	A	1–2	3,984	Farrell
15 October 1996	Bristol City	A	0–3	7,325	
19 October 1996	Stockport County	H	0–2	4,017	
26 October 1996	Wrexham	H	0–0	5,548	
29 October 1996	York City	A	0–2	2,254	
2 November 1996	Crewe Alexandra	A	0–3	3,636	
9 November 1996	Plymouth Argyle	H	2–1	5,456	Brown, McGavin
19 November 1996	Watford	A	0–1	7,657	
23 November 1996	Preston North End	H	0–1	4,920	
30 November 1996	Wrexham	A	0–1	3,280	
3 December 1996	Millwall	H	1–0	4,550	Bell
14 December 1996	Chesterfield	H	1–0	4,610	de Souza
21 December 1996	Bristol Rovers	A	4–3	4,465	Carroll, Bell, Simpson, Evans
26 December 1996	Walsall	H	0–2	5,073	
18 January 1997	Rotherham United	A	1–2	2,692	Carroll (pen)
25 January 1997	York City	H	3–1	4,193	Read (2), Forsyth
1 February 1997	Plymouth Argyle	A	0–0	5,024	
8 February 1997	Crewe Alexandra	H	2–0	4,902	Read, de Souza
15 February 1997	Preston North End	A	1–2	7,923	McGavin
22 February 1997	Watford	H	0–0	8,438	
25 February 1997	Peterborough United	H	2–0	4,001	McGavin, de Souza
1 March 1997	Millwall	A	1–2	7,539	Forsyth
4 March 1997	Brentford	A	0–0	5,375	
8 March 1997	Bristol Rovers	H	2–0	5,386	Stallard, Brown
15 March 1997	Chesterfield	A	2–4	4,354	Stallard, Brown
22 March 1997	Gillingham	A	0–1	5,932	
29 March 1997	Shrewsbury Town	H	3–0	6,562	Scott, Stallard, Carroll
31 March 1997	Bury	A	0–2	5,714	
5 April 1997	Blackpool	H	1–0	5,619	Scott
8 April 1997	Luton Town	A	0–0	7,626	
12 April 1997	Notts County	A	2–1	4,290	Brown, McGavin
15 April 1997	Burnley	H	5–0	5,786	Carroll (2 pens), McGavin, Stallard, Read
19 April 1997	Bournemouth	H	1–1	6,043	Scott
26 April 1997	Stockport County	A	1–2	9,463	Carroll (pen)
3 May 1997	Bristol City	H	2–0	7,240	Carroll, McGavin

=== FA Cup ===
Round	Date	Opponent	Venue	Result	Attendance	Goalscorers
R1	16 November 1996	Colchester United	A	2–1	4,378	de Souza, Williams
R2	7 December 1996	Barnet	A	3–3	3,176	McGavin, Williams (2)
R2R	17 December 1996	Barnet	H	3–2	3,851	Williams, Carroll, de Souza
R3	5 January 1997	Bradford City	H	0–2	5,173	

=== League Cup ===
Round	Date	Opponent	Venue	Result	Attendance	Goalscorers
R1 1st Leg	20 August 1996	Reading	A	1–1	6,210	Williams
R1 2nd Leg	3 September 1996	Reading	H	2–0 (won 3–1 on agg)	5,069	Evans, Williams
R2 1st Leg	18 September 1996	Nottingham Forest	A	0–1	6,482	
R2 2nd Leg	24 September 1996	Nottingham Forest	H	1–1 (lost 1–2 on agg)	6,310	McCarthy

=== Football League Trophy ===
Round	Date	Opponent	Venue	Result	Attendance	Goalscorers
SR1	8 January 1997	Swansea City	A	1–1 (lost 5–6 on pens)	1,638	McGorry

== Squad ==
Note: Flags indicate national team as defined under FIFA eligibility rules; some limited exceptions apply. Players may hold more than one non-FIFA nationality.

No.	Pos.	Nation	Player
—	GK	ENG	John Cheesewright
—	GK	ENG	Brian Parkin
—	GK	ENG	Martin Taylor (on loan from Derby County)
—	DF	ENG	Micky Bell
—	DF	ENG	Jason Cousins
—	DF	ENG	Matt Crossley
—	DF	ENG	Terry Evans
—	DF	ENG	Michael Forsyth
—	DF	ENG	Jason Kavanagh
—	DF	ENG	Matthew Lawrence
—	DF	ENG	Michael Love
—	DF	IRL	Paul McCarthy
—	DF	WAL	Jason Rowbotham
—	DF	ENG	Terry Skiverton
—	MF	ENG	Steve Brown
—	MF	ENG	Paul Buckle
—	MF	SCO	Dave Carroll

No.	Pos.	Nation	Player
—	MF	ENG	John Cornforth
—	MF	ENG	David Farrell
—	MF	NIR	Mo Harkin
—	MF	ENG	Brian McGorry
—	MF	ENG	Gary Patterson
—	MF	ENG	Michael Simpson
—	MF	ENG	Ray Wilkins
—	FW	ENG	Tony Clark
—	FW	ENG	Neil Davis (on loan from Aston Villa)
—	FW	ENG	Miguel de Souza
—	FW	ENG	Michael Mahoney-Johnson (on loan from QPR)
—	FW	ENG	Damien Markman
—	FW	ENG	Steve McGavin
—	FW	ENG	Paul Read
—	FW	ENG	Keith Scott (on loan from Norwich City)
—	FW	ENG	Mark Stallard
—	FW	ENG	John Williams
