= 2000–01 Leicester City F.C. season =

2000–01 season of Leicester City

Leicester City F.C.
2000–01 season
- Chairman: John Elsom
- Manager: Peter Taylor
- Stadium: Filbert Street
- Premier League: 13th
- FA Cup: Quarter-final
- League Cup: Third round
- UEFA Cup: First round
- Top goalscorer: League: Ade Akinbiyi (9); All: Muzzy Izzet (11)
- Highest home attendance: 22,132 vs Manchester United (14 October 2000, FA Premier League)
- Lowest home attendance: 12,965 vs Crystal Palace (1 November 2000, League Cup)
- Average home league attendance: 20,452
Home colours	Away colours	Third colours

During the 2000–01 English football season, Leicester City F.C. competed in the FA Premier League.

== Season summary ==
A superb start to the season saw Leicester City begin October on top of the league just four months after the appointment of Peter Taylor as Martin O'Neill's successor - they had not occupied top place since 1963. Two weeks later, they surrendered their lead to Manchester United but were still in the top four by Christmas. By the midway point of the league season, the Foxes were third in the table with 35 points.

However, their impressive league form soon wore off, and they would only collect another 13 points in the second half of the season. Notably, an upset to Division Two underdogs Wycombe Wanderers in the FA Cup quarter-final midway through March had a negative effect on the Foxes, who endured 9 defeats and attained one win from their final 10 games, collecting only 3 points from a possible 30 and losing 8 consecutive league games. This slump dragged them down to 13th place - their lowest finish since winning promotion to the FA Premier League back in 1996. Several high-profile end-of-season signings - including that of Chelsea legend Dennis Wise - gave fans hope that Leicester could regain their form and rejoin the challenge for honours in 2001–02.

November saw the announcement of plans to relocate to a new 32,000-seat stadium at a site adjacent to Filbert Street, with a targeted completion for the start of the 2003–04 season. Later in the season, it was announced that Leicester would only have to spend one more season at Filbert Street before they could move into their new home.

2000-01 Leicester City team

== Final league table ==
Pos	Team	Pld	W	D	L	GF	GA	GD	Pts	Qualification or relegation
11	Newcastle United	38	14	9	15	44	50	−6	51	Qualification for the Intertoto Cup third round
12	Tottenham Hotspur	38	13	10	15	47	54	−7	49	
13	Leicester City	38	14	6	18	39	51	−12	48	
14	Middlesbrough	38	9	15	14	44	44	0	42	
15	West Ham United	38	10	12	16	45	50	−5	42	

Source: Premier League
Rules for classification: 1) points; 2) goal difference; 3) number of goals scored.

Results summary

Overall								Home						Away					
Pld	W	D	L	GF	GA	GD	Pts	W	D	L	GF	GA	GD	W	D	L	GF	GA	GD
38	14	6	18	39	51	−12	48	10	4	5	28	23	+5	4	2	13	11	28	−17

Source: 2000-01 FA Premier League table

Results by round

Round	1	2	3	4	5	6	7	8	9	10	11	12	13	14	15	16	17	18	19	20	21	22	23	24	25	26	27	28	29	30	31	32	33	34	35	36	37	38
Ground	H	A	A	H	H	A	H	A	H	A	H	A	H	A	A	H	A	H	H	A	H	A	H	A	H	A	H	H	A	A	A	H	H	A	H	A	H	A
Result	D	W	D	W	W	W	D	D	L	L	W	W	D	W	L	W	L	W	W	L	L	L	D	L	W	L	W	W	L	L	L	L	L	L	L	L	W	L
Position	11	4	6	3	2	2	2	1	3	5	3	3	3	3	4	3	4	4	3	4	6	6	7	8	6	7	7	4	7	9	9	10	11	11	12	13	10	13

Source: 11v11.com: 2000-01 Leicester City results
A = Away; H = Home; W = Win; D = Draw; L = Loss

== Results ==
Leicester City's score comes first

=== Legend ===
Win	Draw	Loss

=== Pre-season ===
28 July 2000	Finn Harps	0–1	Leicester City	Ballybofey
			Eadie (?)	Stadium: Finn Park

29 July 2000	Cliftonville	0–2	Leicester City	Belfast
			Eadie (?); Savage (?)	Stadium: Solitude

31 July 2000	Portadown	0–1	Leicester City	Portadown
19:30 BST			Benjamin (?)	Stadium: Shamrock Park

1 August 2000	Wycombe Wanderers	0–3	Leicester City	High Wycombe
19:45 BST			Akinbiyi 57'; Collymore 78'; Dudfield (?)	Stadium: Adams Park; Attendance: 2,368; Referee: Mike Tingey

5 August 2000	Tranmere Rovers	3–1	Leicester City	Tranmere
	Allison 3'; Taylor 28'; Barlow 81' (pen.)		Akinbiyi 63'	Stadium: Prenton Park

7 August 2000	Gillingham	1–2	Leicester City	Gillingham
	Thomson 67'		Davidson 4'; Izzet 52' (pen.)	Stadium: Priestfield Stadium

9 August 2000	Hereford United	1–0	Leicester City	Hereford
				Stadium: Edgar Street

11 August 2000	(Netherlands) RKC Waalwijk	0–0	Leicester City	Waalwijk
				Stadium: Mandemakers Stadion

=== FA Premier League ===
19 August 2000 1	Leicester City	0–0	Aston Villa	Leicester
15:00 BST	Lennon (yellow card) 31'; Savage (yellow card) 34'		Ginola (yellow card) 45'; Merson (yellow card) 75'; Vassell (yellow card) 84'	Stadium: Filbert Street; Attendance: 21,455; Referee: Mike Riley

23 August 2000 2	West Ham United	0–1	Leicester City	London
19:45 BST	Štimac (yellow card) 22' (yellow-red card) 45'; Carrick (yellow card) 87'; Di Canio (yellow card) 89'		Taggart (yellow card) 34'; Izzet (yellow card) 42'; Eadie 53'; Eadie (yellow card) 80'	Stadium: Upton Park; Attendance: 25,195; Referee: Rob Styles

26 August 2000 3	Bradford City	0–0	Leicester City	Bradford
15:00 BST	Windass (yellow card) 17'		Rowett (yellow card) 67'; Taggart (yellow card) 86'	Stadium: Valley Parade; Attendance: 16,766; Referee: Steve Bennett

6 September 2000 4	Leicester City	2–1	Ipswich Town	Leicester
19:45 BST	Taggart (yellow card) 49'; Akinbiyi 57'; Elliott 73'		Bramble (yellow card) 25'; Magilton 89' (pen.)	Stadium: Filbert Street; Attendance: 19,598; Referee: Paul Taylor

9 September 2000 5	Leicester City	1–0	Southampton	Leicester
15:00 BST	Taggart 66'			Stadium: Filbert Street; Attendance: 18,366; Referee: Mike Dean

17 September 2000 6	Chelsea	0–2	Leicester City	London
15:00 BST	Wise (yellow card) 18'; Morris 42'; Hasselbaink (yellow card) 45'		Izzet 8'; Izzet (yellow card) 18'; Collymore 82'	Stadium: Stamford Bridge; Attendance: 33,697; Referee: Graham Barber

24 September 2000 7	Leicester City	1–1	Everton	Leicester
16:00 BST	Akinbiyi 23'; Savage (yellow card) 35'; Eadie (yellow card) 58'; Taggart (yellow card) 67'		Watson (yellow card) 42'; Unsworth 52'	Stadium: Filbert Street; Attendance: 18,084; Referee: Alan Wiley

1 October 2000 8	Sunderland	0–0	Leicester City	Sunderland
15:00 BST	Quinn (yellow card) 43'; Gray (yellow card) 66'; Thome (yellow card) 78'		Taggart (yellow card) 42'	Stadium: Stadium of Light; Attendance: 45,338; Referee: Stephen Lodge

14 October 2000 9	Leicester City	0–3	Manchester United	Leicester
15:00 BST			Sheringham 37', 55'; Solskjær 90'	Stadium: Filbert Street; Attendance: 22,132; Referee: Paul Durkin

21 October 2000 10	Liverpool	1–0	Leicester City	Liverpool
15:00 BST	Ziege (yellow card) 52'; Heskey 69'		Gilchrist (yellow card) 14'; Davidson (yellow card) 21'; Elliott (yellow card) 62'	Stadium: Anfield; Attendance: 44,395; Referee: Andy D'Urso

28 October 2000 11	Leicester City	2–1	Derby County	Leicester
15:00 BST	Izzet 31'; Gunnlaugsson 76'		Delap 12'; Valakari (yellow card) 52'; Christie (yellow card) 79'; Elliott (yellow card) 90'	Stadium: Filbert Street; Attendance: 20,525; Referee: Graham Poll

4 November 2000 12	Manchester City	0–1	Leicester City	Manchester
15:00 GMT	Ritchie (yellow card) 55'		Davidson (yellow card) 18'; Sinclair (yellow card) 61'; Savage 56'	Stadium: Maine Road; Attendance: 34,279; Referee: Mark Halsey

11 November 2000 13	Leicester City	1–1	Newcastle United	Leicester
15:00 GMT	Savage (yellow card) 44'; Gunnlaugsson 63'		Acuña (yellow card) 73'; Speed 75'	Stadium: Filbert Street; Attendance: 21,406; Referee: Rob Styles

18 November 2000 14	Middlesbrough	0–3	Leicester City	Middlesbrough
15:00 GMT	Stamp (yellow card) 16'; Fleming (yellow card) 89'; Marinelli (yellow card) 90'		Izzet 8' (pen.); Benjamin 13'; Eadie 57'; Lennon (yellow card) 60'	Stadium: Riverside Stadium; Attendance: 27,965; Referee: Alan Wiley

25 November 2000 15	Tottenham Hotspur	3–0	Leicester City	London
15:00 GMT	Ferdinand 34', 39', 84'; Clemence (yellow card) 65'		Taggart (yellow card) 15' (yellow-red card) 63'; Savage (yellow card) 16'; Lennon (yellow card) 55'	Stadium: White Hart Lane; Attendance: 35,636; Referee: Rob Harris

2 December 2000 16	Leicester City	3–1	Leeds United	Leicester
15:00 GMT	Savage 8'; Akinbiyi 17'; Taggart 29'; Taggart (yellow card) 84'		Smith (yellow card) 26'; Radebe (yellow card) 28' (yellow-red card) 67'; Viduka 75'	Stadium: Filbert Street; Attendance: 21,486; Referee: Steve Bennett

10 December 2000 17	Coventry City	1–0	Leicester City	Coventry
16:00 GMT	Bellamy 40'		Benjamin (yellow card) 82'	Stadium: Highfield Road; Attendance: 17,283; Referee: Steve Dunn

16 December 2000 18	Leicester City	3–1	Charlton Athletic	Leicester
15:00 GMT	Akinbiyi 35'; Eadie (yellow card) 42'; Elliott 79'; Gunnlaugsson 90'		Johansson 6'; Svensson (yellow card) 31'; Johansson (yellow card) 73'	Stadium: Filbert Street; Attendance: 19,371; Referee: Alan Wiley

23 December 2000 19	Leicester City	2–1	West Ham United	Leicester
15:00 GMT	Taggart (yellow card) 12'; Izzet 26'; Savage 63'		Kanouté 8'	Stadium: Filbert Street; Attendance: 21,524; Referee: Graham Poll

26 December 2000 20	Arsenal	6–1	Leicester City	London
12:00 GMT	Henry 35', 66', 82'; Vieira 50'; Ljungberg 75'; Adams 90'		Akinbiyi 54'	Stadium: Highbury; Attendance: 38,007; Referee: Dermot Gallagher

1 January 2001 21	Leicester City	1–2	Bradford City	Leicester
15:00 GMT	Izzet 38' (pen.)		Jacobs (yellow card) 25'; Jess 25'; Jacobs 30'; Windass (yellow card) 39'; McKinlay (yellow card) 67'	Stadium: Filbert Street; Attendance: 19,278; Referee: Stephen Lodge

14 January 2001 22	Ipswich Town	2–0	Leicester City	Ipswich
16:00 GMT	Stewart 80'; Bramble (yellow card) 85'; Scowcroft 90'		Cresswell (yellow card) 77'	Stadium: Portman Road; Attendance: 22,022; Referee: Mike Riley

20 January 2001 23	Leicester City	0–0	Arsenal	Leicester
15:00 GMT	Jones (yellow card) 12' (yellow-red card) 41'; Sturridge (yellow card) 76'		Sylvinho (yellow card) 78'; Keown (yellow card) 90'	Stadium: Filbert Street; Attendance: 21,872; Referee: Barry Knight

31 January 2001 24	Southampton	1–0	Leicester City	Southampton
19:45 GMT	Petrescu 79'		Guppy (yellow card) 28'; Elliott (yellow card) 59'; Izzet (yellow card) 86'	Stadium: The Dell; Attendance: 14,909; Referee: Steve Bennett

3 February 2001 25	Leicester City	2–1	Chelsea	Leicester
15:00 GMT	Izzet 24'; Rowett 76'		Dalla Bona (yellow card) 19'; Hasselbaink 75'	Stadium: Filbert Street; Attendance: 21,502; Referee: Steve Dunn

10 February 2001 26	Everton	2–1	Leicester City	Liverpool
15:00 GMT	Jeffers 8'; Campbell 43'; Gemmill (yellow card) 45'; Unsworth (yellow card) 58'; Moore (yellow card) 90'		Impey (yellow card) 62'; Sturridge 79'; Rowett (yellow card) 85'	Stadium: Goodison Park; Attendance: 30,409; Referee: Rob Styles

24 February 2001 27	Leicester City	2–0	Sunderland	Leicester
15:00 GMT	Sturridge 30'; Akinbiyi 65'		Oster (yellow card) 44' (yellow-red card) 55'; Kilbane (yellow card) 45'; Quinn (yellow card) 66'; Williams (yellow card) 82'	Stadium: Filbert Street; Attendance: 21,086; Referee: Andy D'Urso

3 March 2001 28	Leicester City	2–0	Liverpool	Leicester
15:00 GMT	Akinbiyi 51'; Izzet (yellow card) 80'; Izzet 90'		Heskey (yellow card) 68'	Stadium: Filbert Street; Attendance: 21,924; Referee: Dermot Gallagher

17 March 2001 29	Manchester United	2–0	Leicester City	Manchester
15:00 GMT	Greening (yellow card) 14'; Yorke 88'; Silvestre 90'		Delaney (yellow card) 81'	Stadium: Old Trafford; Attendance: 67,539; Referee: Alan Wiley

1 April 2001 30	Charlton Athletic	2–0	Leicester City	London
16:00 BST	Todd (yellow card) 27'; Todd 33'; Parker (yellow card) 35'; Bartlett 82'		Impey (yellow card) 43'; Sturridge (yellow card) 54'	Stadium: The Valley; Attendance: 20,043; Referee: Jeff Winter

4 April 2001 31	Aston Villa	2–1	Leicester City	Birmingham
19:45 BST	Dublin 30'; Stone (yellow card) 51'; Alpay (yellow card) 60'; Hendrie 72'		Lewis (yellow card) 22'; Davidson 27'; Taggart (yellow card) 86'	Stadium: Villa Park; Attendance: 29,043; Referee: Mike Dean

7 April 2001 32	Leicester City	1–3	Coventry City	Leicester
15:00 BST	Akinbiyi 10'; Akinbiyi (yellow card) 33'; Rowett (yellow card) 60'; Taggart (yellow card) 90'		Bellamy 2'; Carsley 19'; Carsley (yellow card) 45'; Hartson 51'; Hadji (yellow card) 59'	Stadium: Filbert Street; Attendance: 19,545; Referee: Graham Barber

14 April 2001 33	Leicester City	1–2	Manchester City	Leicester
15:00 BST	Rowett (yellow card) 19'; Taggart (yellow card) 30'; Akinbiyi 41'		Goater 17'; Dunne (yellow card) 40'; Grant (yellow card) 64'; Wanchope 67'; Wanchope (yellow card) 90'	Stadium: Filbert Street; Attendance: 20,224; Referee: Barry Knight

16 April 2001 34	Derby County	2–0	Leicester City	Derby
15:00 BST	Boertien 24'; Delap (yellow card) 36'; Kinkladze (yellow card) 52'; Carbonari (yellow card) 65'; Boertien (yellow card) 90'; Burton (red card) 90'; Eranio 90'		Eadie (yellow card) 75'; Elliott (yellow card) 84'	Stadium: Pride Park; Attendance: 28,387; Referee: Mark Halsey

21 April 2001 35	Leicester City	0–3	Middlesbrough	Leicester
15:00 BST	Taggart (yellow card) 19'; Savage (yellow card) 24'; Sinclair (yellow card) 26'		Ricard 12'; Windass (yellow card) 24'; Bokšić 50'; Ince 52'	Stadium: Filbert Street; Attendance: 18,162; Referee: Paul Taylor

28 April 2001 36	Newcastle United	1–0	Leicester City	Newcastle upon Tyne
15:00 BST	Cort (yellow card) 45'; Cort 90'		Sturridge (yellow card) 58'	Stadium: St James' Park; Attendance: 50,501; Referee: Graham Poll

5 May 2001 37	Leicester City	4–2	Tottenham Hotspur	Leicester
15:00 BST	Rowett 42'; Sturridge (yellow card) 47'; Sturridge 56'; Savage (yellow card) 60'; Sinclair (yellow card) 74'; Guppy 82'; Savage 90' (pen.)		Davies 54'; Carr 61'; Ferdinand (yellow card) 86'; Carr (yellow card) 90'	Stadium: Filbert Street; Attendance: 21,056; Referee: Mike Dean

19 May 2001 38	Leeds United	3–1	Leicester City	Leeds
15:00 BST	Smith 27', 90'; Dacourt (yellow card) 61'; Harte 77'; Bowyer (yellow card) 84'; Bakke (yellow card) 84'		Ferdinand 32' (o.g.); Davidson (yellow card) 35'; Benjamin (yellow card) 76'; Sinclair (yellow card) 84'; Savage (yellow card) 85'	Stadium: Elland Road; Attendance: 39,105; Referee: David Elleray

=== FA Cup ===
6 January 2001 R3	Leicester City	3–0	York City	Leicester
15:00 GMT	Rowett 57'; Izzet 63' (pen.); Cresswell 73'		Agnew (yellow card) 12'	Stadium: Filbert Street; Attendance: 16,850; Referee: Eddie Wolstenholme

27 January 2001 R4	Aston Villa	1–2	Leicester City	Birmingham
15:00 GMT	Vassell (yellow card) 7' (yellow-red card) 34'; Boateng (yellow card) 27'; Joachim 76'		Davidson (yellow card) 16' (yellow-red card) 45'; Akinbiyi 42'; Gunnlaugsson 84'	Stadium: Villa Park; Attendance: 26,383; Referee: Uriah Rennie

17 February 2001 R5	Leicester City	3–0	Bristol City	Leicester
15:00 GMT	Sturridge 10'; Hill 15' (o.g.); Elliott (yellow card) 24'; Izzet 83' (pen.)		Tinnion (yellow card) 83'; Millen (yellow card) 88'	Stadium: Filbert Street; Attendance: 20,905; Referee: Paul Durkin

10 March 2001 QF	Leicester City	1–2	Wycombe Wanderers	Leicester
15:00 GMT	Savage (yellow card) 39'; Oakes (yellow card) 59'; Izzet 68'		Cousins (yellow card) 17'; Brown (yellow card) 32' (yellow-red card) 90'; McCarthy 50'; Simpson (yellow card) 67'; Essandoh 90'	Stadium: Filbert Street; Attendance: 21,969; Referee: Steve Bennett

=== League Cup ===
1 November 2000 R3	Leicester City	0–3	Crystal Palace	Leicester
19:45 GMT			Morrison 17'; Thomson 23'; Rubins 52'; Black (yellow card) 52'	Stadium: Filbert Street; Attendance: 12,965; Referee: Roy Pearson

=== UEFA Cup ===
14 September 2000 R1 1st leg	Leicester City	1–1	Red Star Belgrade	Leicester
19:45 BST	Savage (yellow card) 14'; Taggart 43'; Collymore (yellow card) 84'		Ačimovič 2'; Lalatović (yellow card) 21'; Glogovac (red card) 75'; Kocić (yellow card) 84'; Lerinc (yellow card) 90'	Stadium: Filbert Street; Attendance: 20,190; Referee: Tom Henning Øvrebø

28 September 2000 R1 2nd leg	Red Star Belgrade	3–1 (4–2 agg.)	Leicester City	Vienna
19:00 CEST	Drulić 22', 71'; Vitakić (yellow card) 45'; Gvozdenović 47'; Bajčetić (yellow card) 62'		Izzet (yellow card) 24'; Izzet 42'; Eadie (yellow card) 45'; Elliott (yellow card) 67'	Stadium: Ernst-Happel-Stadion; Attendance: 12,700; Referee: Pasquale Rodomonti

== First-team squad ==
Squad at end of season

Note: Flags indicate national team as defined under FIFA eligibility rules; some limited exceptions apply. Players may hold more than one non-FIFA nationality.

No.	Pos.	Nation	Player
1	GK	ENG	Tim Flowers
2	DF	ENG	Gary Rowett
3	DF	JAM	Frank Sinclair
4	DF	NIR	Gerry Taggart
6	MF	TUR	Muzzy Izzet
7	MF	WAL	Matt Jones
8	MF	WAL	Robbie Savage (Vice captain)
9	FW	ENG	Darren Eadie
11	MF	ENG	Steve Guppy
12	GK	ENG	Simon Royce
13	FW	ISL	Arnar Gunnlaugsson
14	DF	SCO	Callum Davidson
16	MF	SCO	Stuart Campbell (on loan to Grimsby Town)
17	MF	ENG	Stefan Oakes
18	DF	SCO	Matt Elliott (captain)

No.	Pos.	Nation	Player
20	FW	JAM	Trevor Benjamin
21	FW	ENG	Dean Sturridge
22	FW	NGA	Ade Akinbiyi
23	FW	ENG	Richard Cresswell
24	MF	ENG	Andrew Impey
25	MF	ENG	Junior Lewis
26	DF	ENG	Lee Marshall
28	FW	ENG	Lawrie Dudfield
29	DF	IRL	Damien Delaney
30	GK	ENG	Michael Price
32	MF	ENG	Matt Piper
33	GK	ENG	Ian Andrews
35	FW	ENG	Kevin Ellison
45	MF	NIR	Tim McCann
46	DF	ENG	Jordan Stewart

=== Left club during season ===
Note: Flags indicate national team as defined under FIFA eligibility rules; some limited exceptions apply. Players may hold more than one non-FIFA nationality.

No.	Pos.	Nation	Player
5	DF	ENG	Steve Walsh (to Norwich City)
7	MF	NIR	Neil Lennon (to Celtic)
10	FW	ENG	Stan Collymore (to Bradford City)
10	FW	ITA	Roberto Mancini (retired)

No.	Pos.	Nation	Player
15	MF	ENG	Phil Gilchrist (to West Bromwich Albion)
21	MF	SCO	Billy McKinlay (on loan from Blackburn Rovers)
25	MF	ENG	Stuart Wilson (to Cambridge United)
27	FW	ENG	Tony Cottee (to Norwich City)

=== Reserve squad ===
Note: Flags indicate national team as defined under FIFA eligibility rules; some limited exceptions apply. Players may hold more than one non-FIFA nationality.

No.	Pos.	Nation	Player
—	GK	ENG	Matthew Nurse
—	DF	ENG	Jon Ashton
—	DF	ENG	Tommy Goodwin
—	DF	ENG	Ashley Lyth
—	DF	ENG	Michael Savage
—	MF	ENG	Brett Darby
—	MF	ENG	Ross Mitchell

No.	Pos.	Nation	Player
—	MF	ENG	Alex Mortimer
—	MF	ENG	Garry Parker
—	MF	ENG	Danny Thomas
—	FW	IRL	Declan Field
—	FW	ENG	Jon Stevenson
—	FW	IRL	Éamon Zayed

== Staff ==
Position	Staff
President	(England) Terence Shipman
Director & Chairman	(England) John Elsom
Director	(England) Martin George
Chief operating officer & finance director	(England) Steve Kind
First-team manager	(England) Peter Taylor
First-team coach	(England) Steve Butler
Goalkeeping coach	(Republic of Ireland) Jim McDonagh
Reserve team coach	(England) Garry Parker
Head academy coach	(England) Steve Beaglehole
Head academy goalkeeping coach	(England) Richard Hartis
Physiotherapists	(England) Ian Andrews
Physiotherapists	(England) Dave Rennie
Physiotherapists	(England) Mick Yeoman
Football coordinator	(Republic of Ireland) Colin Murphy
Club doctor	(England) Ian Patchett
Academy head of recruitment	(England) Mick Raynor
Youth Academy director	(England) Alan Hill
Youth Academy Assistant Directors	(England) Jon Rudkin
Youth Academy Assistant Directors	(Wales) Daral Pugh

Source: Leicester City F.C.

== Transfers ==
=== In ===
Date	Pos	Name	From	Fee	Ref
4 July 2000	DF	(England) Gary Rowett	Birmingham City	£3,000,000	
7 July 2000	DF	(Scotland) Callum Davidson	Blackburn Rovers	£1,750,000	
11 July 2000	GK	(England) Simon Royce	Charlton Athletic	Free transfer	
12 July 2000	FW	(Jamaica) Trevor Benjamin	Cambridge United	£1,500,000	
25 July 2000	FW	(Nigeria) Ade Akinbiyi	Wolverhampton Wanderers	£5,000,000	
1 September 2000	FW	(England) Richard Cresswell	Sheffield Wednesday	£750,000	
24 October 2000	DF	(Republic of Ireland) Damien Delaney	Cork City	£50,000	
14 December 2000	MF	(Wales) Matt Jones	Leeds United	£3,000,000	
19 January 2001	FW	(England) Dean Sturridge	Derby County	£350,000	
6 February 2001	FW	(England) Kevin Ellison	Altrincham	£50,000	
15 March 2001	MF	(England) Junior Lewis	Gillingham	£150,000	
22 March 2001	DF	(England) Lee Marshall	Norwich City	£600,000	
29 March 2001	DF	(England) Ashley Lyth	Scarborough	£100,000	

=== Out ===
Date	Pos	Name	To	Fee	Ref
1 June 2000	MF	(Greece) Theodoros Zagorakis	AEK Athens	Free transfer	
1 July 2000	GK	(France) Pegguy Arphexad	Liverpool	Free transfer	
1 August 2000	FW	(England) Ian Marshall	Bolton Wanderers	Free transfer	
10 August 2000	MF	(England) Graham Fenton	Stoke City	Monthly	
10 September 2000	FW	(England) Tony Cottee	Norwich City	Free transfer	
15 September 2000	DF	(England) Steve Walsh	Norwich City	Signed	
26 October 2000	FW	(England) Stan Collymore	Bradford City	Free transfer	
8 December 2000	MF	(Northern Ireland) Neil Lennon	Celtic	£5,750,000	
22 December 2000	FW	(England) Stuart Wilson	Cambridge United	Free transfer	
23 March 2001	DF	(England) Phil Gilchrist	West Bromwich Albion	£500,000	

Transfers in: ▼£16,300,000
Transfers out: ▲£6,250,000
Total spending: ▼£10,050,000

=== Loan in ===
Date	Pos	Player	Club	End	Ref
27 October 2000	MF	(Scotland) Billy McKinlay	Blackburn Rovers	5 November 2000	
30 January 2001	MF	(England) Junior Lewis	Gillingham	14 March 2001	
18 January 2001	FW	(Italy) Roberto Mancini	Lazio	End of the season	

=== Loan out ===
Date	Pos	Player	Club	Return	Ref
15 September 2000	FW	(England) Lawrie Dudfield	Lincoln City	15 October 2000	
15 September 2000	MF	(Scotland) Stuart Campbell	Grimsby Town	7 May 2001	
4 December 2000	FW	(England) Lawrie Dudfield	Chesterfield	7 March 2001	
9 March 2001	FW	(England) Richard Cresswell	Preston North End	End of the season	

== Statistics ==
=== Appearances, goals and cards ===
(Starting appearances + substitute appearances)
Players with squad numbers struck through and marked † left the club during the playing season.
Players with names in italics and marked * were on loan from another club for the whole of their season with Leicester.

No.	Pos.	Name	League		FA Cup		League Cup		UEFA Cup		Total		Discipline	
No.	Pos.	Name	Apps	Goals	Apps	Goals	Apps	Goals	Apps	Goals	Apps	Goals	Yellow card	Red card
1	GK	(England) Tim Flowers	22	0	0	0	0	0	2	0	24	0	1	0
2	DF	(England) Gary Rowett	38	2	4	1	1	0	2	0	45	3	4	0
3	DF	(Jamaica) Frank Sinclair	14+3	0	1	0	1	0	0	0	16+3	0	4	0
4	DF	(Northern Ireland) Gerry Taggart	24	2	2	0	0	0	2	1	28	3	11	1
~~5~~†	DF	(England) Steve Walsh	0+1	0	0	0	0	0	0	0	0+1	0	0	0
6	MF	(Turkey) Muzzy Izzet	27	7	3	3	0+1	0	2	1	32+1	11	5	0
7	MF	(Wales) Matt Jones	10+1	0	3	0	0	0	0	0	13+1	0	0	1
~~7~~†	MF	(Northern Ireland) Neil Lennon	15	0	0	0	1	0	2	0	18	0	3	0
8	MF	(Wales) Robbie Savage	33	4	4	0	0	0	2	0	39	4	9	0
9	FW	(England) Darren Eadie	16+8	2	0+1	0	1	0	2	0	19+9	2	5	0
~~10~~†	FW	(England) Stan Collymore	1+4	1	0	0	0	0	0+1	0	1+5	1	1	0
10*	FW	(Italy) Roberto Mancini	3+1	0	1	0	0	0	0	0	4+1	0	0	0
11	MF	(England) Steve Guppy	17+11	1	3	0	1	0	2	0	23+11	1	1	0
12	GK	(England) Simon Royce	16+3	0	4	0	1	0	0	0	21+3	0	0	0
13	FW	(Iceland) Arnar Gunnlaugsson	3+14	3	0+3	1	1	0	0+1	0	4+18	4	0	0
14	MF	(Scotland) Callum Davidson	25+3	1	2	0	1	0	0+1	0	28+4	1	3	1
~~15~~†	DF	(England) Phil Gilchrist	6+6	0	1+1	0	1	0	0	0	8+7	0	1	0
17	MF	(England) Stefan Oakes	5+8	0	1+2	0	0	0	0	0	6+10	0	1	0
18	DF	(Scotland) Matt Elliott	34	2	4	0	0+1	0	2	0	40+1	2	5	0
20	FW	(Jamaica) Trevor Benjamin	7+14	1	1+2	0	0+1	0	0	0	8+17	1	2	0
21*	MF	(Scotland) Billy McKinlay	0	0	0	0	1	0	0	0	1	0	0	0
21	FW	(England) Dean Sturridge	12+1	3	2	1	0	0	0	0	14+1	4	4	0
22	FW	(Nigeria) Ade Akinbiyi	33+4	9	4	1	0	0	2	0	39+4	10	1	0
23	FW	(England) Richard Cresswell	3+5	0	0+2	1	1	0	0+2	0	4+9	1	1	0
24	MF	(England) Andrew Impey	29+4	0	3	0	0	0	2	0	34+4	0	2	0
25	MF	(England) Junior Lewis	15	0	0	0	0	0	0	0	15	0	1	0
26	DF	(England) Lee Marshall	7+2	0	0	0	0	0	0	0	7+2	0	0	0
~~27~~†	FW	(England) Tony Cottee	0+2	0	0	0	0	0	0	0	0+2	0	0	0
29	DF	(Republic of Ireland) Damien Delaney	3+2	0	1+1	0	0	0	0	0	4+3	0	1	0
35	FW	(England) Kevin Ellison	0+1	0	0	0	0	0	0	0	0+1	0	0	0
