= 2000–01 FA Cup =

Tournament details
- Country: England; Wales

Final positions
- Champions: Liverpool (6th title)
- Runners-up: Arsenal

Tournament statistics
- Top goal scorer(s): Sylvain Wiltord; Robert Earnshaw (6 goals)

The 2000–01 FA Cup (known as the FA Cup sponsored by AXA for sponsorship reasons) was the 120th season of the world's oldest knockout football competition, the FA Cup. The competition was won by Liverpool, who came from 1–0 behind against Arsenal to eventually win 2–1 in the final. The final was played outside England for the first time, at the Millennium Stadium in Cardiff, because Wembley Stadium was being knocked down to be replaced with a new stadium.

== Qualifying rounds ==
All participating clubs that were not members of the Premier League or Football League entered the competition in the qualifying rounds to secure one of 32 places available in the first round proper.

The winners from the fourth qualifying round were Gateshead, Chester City, Barrow, Northwich Victoria, Radcliffe Borough, Leigh RMI, Morecambe, Southport, Frickley Athletic, Burton Albion, Telford United, Nuneaton Borough, Ilkeston Town, Rushden & Diamonds, Harrow Borough, Canvey Island, Dagenham & Redbridge, AFC Sudbury, Grays Athletic, Hednesford Town, Kettering Town, Forest Green Rovers, Havant & Waterlooville, Bracknell Town, Hayes, Gravesend & Northfleet, Dorchester Town, Yeovil Town, Aldershot Town, Hampton & Richmond Borough, Kingstonian and Woking.

Radcliffe Borough, Bracknell Town and Hampton & Richmond Borough were appearing in the competition proper for the first time. Following recent amalgamations, AFC Sudbury and Havant & Waterlooville were also qualifying for the main draw for the first time in their own right, although predecessor clubs Sudbury Town (in 1996-97) and Waterlooville (in 1988-89) had reached the first round in previous seasons. Of the others, Frickley Athletic and Grays Athletic were also featuring at this stage for the first time since 1988-89 while Harrow Borough had last qualififed for the first round in 1983-84.

== First round proper ==
This round is the first in which teams from the Second Division and Third Division compete with non-League teams. Most of the initial matches were played on the weekend of 17-19 November 2000, except for the Gravesend & Northfleet-Notts County fixture which was played at Gillingham's Priestfield Stadium on 8 December. As was the case in the fourth qualifying round, Bracknell Town, from the Isthmian League Third Division at Step 9 of English football, was the lowest-ranked team in the draw.

Tie no	Home team	Score	Away team
1	Blackpool (4)	3–1	Telford United (5)
2	Chester City (5)	1–1	Plymouth Argyle (4)
replay	Plymouth Argyle (4)	1–2	Chester City (5)
3	Chesterfield (4)	0–1	Bristol City (3)
4	Darlington (4)	6–1	AFC Sudbury (8)
5	AFC Bournemouth (3)	2–0	Swansea City (3)
6	Barnet (4)	2–1	Hampton & Richmond Borough (6)
7	Barrow (6)	0–2	Leyton Orient (4)
8	Bury (3)	1–1	Northwich Victoria (5)
replay	Northwich Victoria (5)	1–0	Bury (3)
9	Canvey Island (6)	4–4	Port Vale (3)
replay	Port Vale (3)	1–2	Canvey Island (6)
10	Yeovil Town (5)	5–1	Colchester United (3)
11	Reading (3)	4–0	Grays Athletic (6)
12	Walsall (3)	4–0	Exeter City (4)
13	Macclesfield Town (4)	0–1	Oxford United (3)
14	Lincoln City (4)	4–0	Bracknell Town (9)
15	Luton Town (3)	1–0	Rushden & Diamonds (5)
16	Swindon Town (3)	4–1	Ilkeston Town (6)
17	Wrexham (3)	0–1	Rotherham United (3)
18	Hednesford Town (5)	2–4	Oldham Athletic (3)
19	Wycombe Wanderers (3)	3–0	Harrow Borough (6)
20	Kidderminster Harriers (4)	0–0	Burton Albion (6)
replay	Burton Albion (6)	2–4	Kidderminster Harriers (4)
21	Brentford (3)	1–3	Kingstonian (5)
22	Northampton Town (3)	4–0	Frickley Athletic (6)
23	Leigh RMI (5)	0–3	Millwall (3)
24	Carlisle United (4)	5–1	Woking (5)
25	Scunthorpe United (4)	3–1	Hartlepool United (4)
26	Mansfield Town (4)	1–1	Peterborough United (3)
replay	Peterborough United (3)	4–0	Mansfield Town (4)
27	Cardiff City (4)	5–1	Bristol Rovers (3)
28	Halifax Town (4)	0–2	Gateshead (6)
29	Cheltenham Town (4)	4–1	Shrewsbury Town (4)
30	Torquay United (4)	1–1	Southend United (4)
replay	Southend United (4)	2–1	Torquay United (4)
31	Kettering Town (5)	0–0	Hull City (4)
replay	Hull City (4)	0–1	Kettering Town (5)
32	Stoke City (3)	0–0	Nuneaton Borough (5)
replay	Nuneaton Borough (5)	1–0	Stoke City (3)
33	Wigan Athletic (3)	3–1	Dorchester Town (6)
34	Gravesend & Northfleet (6)	1–2	Notts County (3)
35	Cambridge United (3)	2–1	Rochdale (4)
36	Radcliffe Borough (7)	1–4	York City (4)
37	Forest Green Rovers (5)	0–3	Morecambe (5)
38	Dagenham & Redbridge (5)	3–1	Hayes (5)
39	Aldershot Town (6)	2–6	Brighton & Hove Albion (4)
40	Havant & Waterooville (6)	1–2	Southport (5)

=== Upsets ===
Giantkiller (tier)	Opponent (tier)
Upset of two or more leagues above
Canvey Island (level 6)	2–1 away vs Port Vale (level 3)
Gateshead (level 6)	2–0 at home vs Halifax Town (level 4)
Northwich Victoria (level 5)	1–0 at home vs Bury (level 3)
Yeovil Town (level 5)	5–1 at home vs Colchester United (level 3)
Kingstonian (level 5)	3–1 away vs Brentford (level 3)
Nuneaton Borough (level 5)	1–0 at home vs Stoke City (level 3)

== Second round proper ==
The initial matches were scheduled for the weekend of 8-10 December 2000, although the Wigan Athletic-Notts County match was played on the following Tuesday due to the late completion of Notts County's first round tie. Step 6 sides Gateshead, from the Northern Premier League, and Canvey Island, from the Isthmian League, were the lowest-ranked teams in the draw.

Tie no	Home team	Score	Away team
1	Blackpool (4)	0–1	Yeovil Town (5)
2	Chester City (5)	3–2	Oxford United (3)
3	Darlington (4)	0–0	Luton Town (3)
replay	Luton Town (3)	2–0	Darlington (4)
4	AFC Bournemouth (3)	3–0	Nuneaton Borough (5)
5	Bristol City (3)	3–1	Kettering Town (5)
6	Walsall (3)	2–1	Barnet (4)
7	Northwich Victoria (5)	3–3	Leyton Orient (4)
replay	Leyton Orient (4)	3–2	Northwich Victoria (5)
8	Lincoln City (4)	0–1	Dagenham & Redbridge (5)
9	Swindon Town (3)	5–0	Gateshead (6)
10	Kidderminster Harriers (4)	0–2	Carlisle United (4)
11	Millwall (3)	0–0	Wycombe Wanderers (3)
replay	Wycombe Wanderers (3)	2–1	Millwall (3)
12	Southend United (4)	2–1	Canvey Island (6)
13	Scunthorpe United (4)	2–1	Brighton & Hove Albion (4)
14	Cardiff City (4)	3–1	Cheltenham Town (4)
15	Southport (5)	1–2	Kingstonian (5)
16	Morecambe (5)	2–1	Cambridge United (3)
17	York City (4)	2–2	Reading (3)
replay	Reading (3)	1–3	York City (4)
18	Rotherham United (3)	1–0	Northampton Town (3)
19	Wigan Athletic (3)	1–1	Notts County (3)
replay	Notts County (3)	2–1	Wigan Athletic (3)
20	Peterborough United (3)	1–1	Oldham Athletic (3)
replay	Oldham Athletic (3)	0–1	Peterborough United (3)

=== Upsets ===
Giantkiller (tier)	Opponent (tier)
Upset of two or more leagues above
Chester City (level 5)	3–2 at home vs Oxford United (level 3)
Morecambe (level 5)	2–1 at home vs Cambridge United (level 3)

== Third round proper ==
This round marked the first time First Division and Premier League (top-flight) teams played. The draw for the 3rd round of the FA Cup was taken on Sunday 10 December 2000. Football Conference (Step 5) sides Morecambe, Chester City, Kingstonian, Dagenham & Redbridge and Yeovil Town were the lowest-ranked teams in the round.

6 January 2001	AFC Bournemouth (3)	2–3	Gillingham (2)	Bournemouth
	Defoe 21'; Fletcher 55'	Report	Hope 17'; Hessenthaler 27'; Shaw 71'	Stadium: Dean Court; Attendance: 7,403; Referee: Rob Harris

6 January 2001	Burnley (2)	2–2	Scunthorpe United (4)	Burnley
	Thomas-Moore 45'; Johnrose 90'	Report	Hodges 2'; Ipoua 47'	Stadium: Turf Moor; Attendance: 8,054; Referee: Graham Frankland

23 January 2001 Replay	Scunthorpe United (4)	1–1 (a.e.t.) (5–4 p)	Burnley (2)	Scunthorpe
	Dawson 82'	Report	Payton 73'	Stadium: Glanford Park; Attendance: 4,709; Referee: Graham Frankland

6 January 2001	Liverpool (1)	3–0	Rotherham United (3)	Liverpool
	Heskey 47', 75'; Hamann 73'; Bišćan (yellow card) 62' (red card)	Report		Stadium: Anfield; Attendance: 30,689; Referee: Mark Halsey

6 January 2001	Preston North End (2)	0–1	Stockport County (2)	Preston
		Report	Fradin 71'	Stadium: Deepdale; Attendance: 9,975; Referee: Paul Danson

6 January 2001	Southampton (1)	1–0	Sheffield United (2)	Southampton
	Dodd 73' (pen.)	Report	Ford (red card) 74'	Stadium: The Dell; Attendance: 14,158; Referee: David Elleray

6 January 2001	Watford (2)	1–2	Everton (1)	Watford
	Mooney 21'; Page (yellow card) 81' (red card)	Report	Hughes 82'; Watson 90'	Stadium: Vicarage Road; Attendance: 15,635; Referee: Rob Styles

6 January 2001	Walsall (3)	2–3	West Ham United (1)	Walsall
	Wrack 33'; Angell 87'	Report	Lampard 6'; Kanouté 57', 81'	Stadium: Bescot Stadium; Attendance: 9,402; Referee: Andy D'Urso

6 January 2001	Leicester City (1)	3–0	York City (4)	Leicester
	Rowett 57'; Izzet 63' (pen.); Cresswell 73'	Report		Stadium: Filbert Street; Attendance: 16,850; Referee: Eddie Wolstenholme

7 January 2001	Nottingham Forest (2)	0–1	Wolverhampton Wanderers (2)	Nottingham
		Report	Proudlock 87'	Stadium: City Ground; Attendance: 14,601; Referee: David Pugh

6 January 2001	Blackburn Rovers (2)	2–0	Chester City (5)	Blackburn
	Taylor 72'; Bent 84'	Report		Stadium: Ewood Park; Attendance: 15,223; Referee: Steve Baines

6 January 2001	Sheffield Wednesday (2)	2–1	Norwich City (2)	Sheffield
	Hamshaw 41'; Sibon 82'	Report	Roberts 74'	Stadium: Hillsborough; Attendance: 15,971; Referee: David Laws

6 January 2001	Bolton Wanderers (2)	2–1	Yeovil Town (5)	Bolton
	O'Kane 44'; Ricketts 90'	Report	Patmore 25'	Stadium: Reebok Stadium; Attendance: 11,161; Referee: Roy Pearson

6 January 2001	Sunderland (1)	0–0	Crystal Palace (2)	Sunderland
	Varga (red card) 89'	Report	Mullins (red card) 57'	Stadium: Stadium of Light; Attendance: 30,908; Referee: Mike Riley

17 January 2001 Replay	Crystal Palace (2)	2–4 (a.e.t.)	Sunderland (1)	London
	Morrison 24'; Thomson 24'	Report	Quinn 73'; Phillips 73', 102', 113'; Dichio (yellow card) 103' (red card)	Stadium: Selhurst Park; Attendance: 15,454; Referee: Mike Riley

6 January 2001	Derby County (1)	3–2	West Bromwich Albion (2)	Derby
	Christie 43', 75'; Eranio 53'	Report	Taylor 77'; Hughes 80'	Stadium: Pride Park; Attendance: 19,232; Referee: Neale Barry

6 January 2001	Luton Town (3)	3–3	Queens Park Rangers (2)	Luton
	Fotiadis 27'; George 36'; Douglas 77'	Report	Crouch 48', 53'; Peacock 90' (pen.)	Stadium: Kenilworth Road; Attendance: 8,677; Referee: Roger Furnandiz

17 January 2001 Replay	Queens Park Rangers (2)	2–1 (a.e.t.)	Luton Town (3)	London
	Kiwomya 90', 112'	Report	Mansell 1'	Stadium: Loftus Road; Attendance: 14,395; Referee: Roger Furnandiz

6 January 2001	Swindon Town (3)	0–2	Coventry City (1)	Swindon
		Report	Bellamy 5'; Hadji 64'	Stadium: County Ground; Attendance: 14,445; Referee: Steve Bennett

7 January 2001	Newcastle United (1)	1–1	Aston Villa (1)	Newcastle
	Solano 80'	Report	Stone 54'	Stadium: St James' Park; Attendance: 37,682; Referee: Paul Durkin

17 January 2001 Replay	Aston Villa (1)	1–0	Newcastle United (1)	Birmingham
	Vassell 50'	Report		Stadium: Villa Park; Attendance: 25,387; Referee: Paul Durkin

6 January 2001	Wycombe Wanderers (3)	1–1	Grimsby Town (2)	Newcastle
	McCarthy 73'	Report	Nielsen 43'	Stadium: Adams Park; Attendance: 5,390; Referee: Phil Dowd

16 January 2001 Replay	Grimsby Town (2)	1–3	Wycombe Wanderers (3)	Cleethorpes
	Jeffrey 44'	Report	McCarthy 31'; Simpson 32'; Rogers 66'	Stadium: Blundell Park; Attendance: 3,269; Referee: Phil Dowd

6 January 2001	Manchester City (1)	3–2	Birmingham City (2)	Manchester
	Morrison 18'; Huckerby 31'; Goater 41' (pen.)	Report	Grainger 57'; Adebola 61'	Stadium: Maine Road; Attendance: 19,380; Referee: Matt Messias

7 January 2001	Fulham (2)	1–2	Manchester United (1)	London
	Fernandes 24'	Report	Solskjær 8'; Sheringham 89'	Stadium: Craven Cottage; Attendance: 19,178; Referee: Jeff Winter

6 January 2001	Portsmouth (2)	1–2	Tranmere Rovers (2)	Portsmouth
	Bradbury 8'	Report	Yates 44'; Parkinson 69'; Roberts (yellow card) 71' (red card)	Stadium: Fratton Park; Attendance: 11,058; Referee: Dermot Gallagher

8 January 2001	Bradford City (1)	0–1	Middlesbrough (1)	Bradford
		Report	Ricard 69'	Stadium: Valley Parade; Attendance: 7,303; Referee: Graham Barber

6 January 2001	Carlisle United (4)	0–1	Arsenal (1)	Carlisle
		Report	Wiltord 22'	Stadium: Brunton Park; Attendance: 15,300; Referee: Stephen Lodge

6 January 2001	Chelsea (1)	5–0	Peterborough United (3)	London
	Zola 37', 84'; Hasselbaink 45'; Guðjohnsen 72'; Poyet 74'	Report		Stadium: Stamford Bridge; Attendance: 31,912; Referee: Clive Wilkes

6 January 2001	Wimbledon (2)	2–2	Notts County (3)	London
	Ardley 29'; Karlsson 42'	Report	Hughes 36'; Stallard 49'	Stadium: Selhurst Park; Attendance: 4,391; Referee: Peter Walton

27 January 2001 Replay	Notts County (3)	0–1 (a.e.t.)	Wimbledon (2)	Nottingham
		Report	Andersen 119'; Willmott (yellow card) 110' (red card)	Stadium: Meadow Lane; Attendance: 9,084; Referee: Peter Walton

6 January 2001	Southend United (4)	0–1	Kingstonian (5)	Southend
	Roget (red card) 45'	Report	Akuamoah 8'; Patterson (red card) 45'	Stadium: Roots Hall; Attendance: 7,270; Referee: Keith Hill

6 January 2001	Huddersfield Town (2)	0–2	Bristol City (3)	Huddersfield
		Report	Clist 55'; Beadle 82'	Stadium: Alfred McAlpine Stadium; Attendance: 9,192; Referee: William Burns

6 January 2001	Cardiff City (4)	1–1	Crewe Alexandra (2)	Cardiff
	Bowen 18' (o.g.)	Report	Young 62'	Stadium: Ninian Park; Attendance: 13,403; Referee: Mark Warren

16 January 2001 Replay	Crewe Alexandra (2)	2–1	Cardiff City (4)	Crewe
	Smith 10'; Rivers 77'	Report	Earnshaw 37'	Stadium: Gresty Road; Attendance: 5,785; Referee: Mark Warren

6 January 2001	Charlton Athletic (1)	1–1	Dagenham & Redbridge (5)	London
	Salako 86'	Report	McDougald 42'	Stadium: The Valley; Attendance: 19,059; Referee: Alan Wiley

27 January 2001 Replay	Dagenham & Redbridge (5)	0–1 (a.e.t.)	Charlton Athletic (1)	Dagenham
		Report	Newton 92'	Stadium: Victoria Road; Attendance: 5,394; Referee: Alan Wiley

6 January 2001	Morecambe (5)	0–3	Ipswich Town (1)	Morecambe
		Report	Stewart 14'; Armstrong 65'; Wright 75'	Stadium: Christie Park; Attendance: 5,923; Referee: Uriah Rennie

6 January 2001	Leeds United (1)	1–0	Barnsley (2)	Leeds
	Viduka 9'	Report		Stadium: Elland Road; Attendance: 32,386; Referee: Graham Poll

6 January 2001	Leyton Orient (4)	0–1	Tottenham Hotspur (1)	Leyton
		Report	Doherty 90'	Stadium: Brisbane Road; Attendance: 12,336; Referee: Peter Jones

== Fourth round proper ==
Matches played the weekend of 27 January, with replays during the week of 6 February. Kingstonian was again the lowest-ranked team in the round and, by this stage, was also the last non-league club left in the competition.

27 January 2001	Bristol City (3)	1–1	Kingstonian (5)	Bristol
	Thorpe 90'	Report	Wingfield 57'	Stadium: Ashton Gate; Attendance: 14,787; Referee: Graham Poll

7 February 2001 Replay	Kingstonian (5)	0–1	Bristol City (3)	Kingston upon Thames
		Report	Murray 88'	Stadium: Kingsmeadow; Attendance: 3,341; Referee: Barry Knight

27 January 2001	Southampton (1)	3–1	Sheffield Wednesday (2)	Southampton
	Davies 11'; Dodd 80' (pen.); Beattie 90'	Report	Booth 66'	Stadium: The Dell; Attendance: 15,251; Referee: Clive Wilkes

28 January 2001	Gillingham (2)	2–4	Chelsea (1)	Gillingham
	Shaw 51'; Onuora 66'	Report	Guðjohnsen 3', 90'; Grønkjær 13', 24'	Stadium: Priestfield Stadium; Attendance: 10,419; Referee: Dermot Gallagher

27 January 2001	Blackburn Rovers (2)	0–0	Derby County (1)	Blackburn
		Report		Stadium: Ewood Park; Attendance: 18,858; Referee: Roy Pearson

7 February 2001 Replay	Derby County (1)	2–5	Blackburn Rovers (2)	Derby
	Riggott 3'; Eranio 70'	Report	Flitcroft 48'; Bent 57', 71'; Dunn 65' (pen.); Jansen 77'	Stadium: Pride Park; Attendance: 15,203; Referee: Roy Pearson

27 January 2001	Aston Villa (1)	1–2	Leicester City (1)	Birmingham
	Joachim 76'; Vassell (yellow card) 34' (red card)	Report	Akinbiyi 42'; Gunnlaugsson 84'; Davidson (yellow card) 45' (red card)	Stadium: Villa Park; Attendance: 26,383; Referee: Uriah Rennie

28 January 2001	Bolton Wanderers (2)	5–1	Scunthorpe United (4)	Bolton
	Holdsworth 27', 29', 47'; Nolan 51', 75'	Report	Calvo García 30'	Stadium: Reebok Stadium; Attendance: 11,737; Referee: Matt Messias

27 January 2001	Crewe Alexandra (2)	0–1	Stockport County (2)	Crewe
		Report	Wiss 85'	Stadium: Alexandra Stadium; Attendance: 7,318; Referee: Mick Fletcher

6 February 2001	Middlesbrough (1)	0–0	Wimbledon (2)	Middlesbrough
		Report		Stadium: Riverside Stadium; Attendance: 20,625; Referee: Mike Dean

13 February 2001 Replay	Wimbledon (2)	3–1 (a.e.t.)	Middlesbrough (1)	London
	Ardley 76' (pen.); Euell 95'; Hunt 112'	Report	Ricard 45'; Ehiogu (red card) 97'	Stadium: Selhurst Park; Attendance: 5,991; Referee: Mike Dean

27 January 2001	Sunderland (1)	1–0	Ipswich Town (1)	Sunderland
	Dichio 23'	Report		Stadium: Stadium of Light; Attendance: 33,626; Referee: Steve Bennett

27 January 2001	Everton (1)	0–3	Tranmere Rovers (2)	Liverpool
		Report	Yates 22', 62'; Koumas 35'	Stadium: Goodison Park; Attendance: 39,207; Referee: Jeff Winter

27 January 2001	Wycombe Wanderers (3)	2–1	Wolverhampton Wanderers (2)	High Wycombe
	Rammell 37'; Parkin 85'	Report	Robinson 59'	Stadium: Adams Park; Attendance: 9,617; Referee: Paul Danson

27 January 2001	Manchester City (1)	1–0	Coventry City (1)	Manchester
	Goater 90'	Report		Stadium: Maine Road; Attendance: 24,637; Referee: David Elleray

27 January 2001	Queens Park Rangers (2)	0–6	Arsenal (1)	London
		Report	Plummer 32' (o.g.); Wiltord 33', 56'; Rose 49'; Pires 58'; Bergkamp 74'	Stadium: Loftus Road; Attendance: 19,003; Referee: Neale Barry

28 January 2001	Manchester United (1)	0–1	West Ham United (1)	Manchester
		Report	Di Canio 76'	Stadium: Old Trafford; Attendance: 67,029; Referee: Paul Durkin

7 February 2001	Charlton Athletic (1)	2–4	Tottenham Hotspur (1)	London
	Powell 11'; Svensson 49'	Report	Rufus 58' (o.g.); Anderton 62'; Leonhardsen 63'; Rebrov 82'	Stadium: The Valley; Attendance: 18,101; Referee: Steve Dunn

27 January 2001	Leeds United (1)	0–2	Liverpool (1)	Leeds
		Report	Barmby 88'; Heskey 90'	Stadium: Elland Road; Attendance: 37,108; Referee: Andy D'Urso

== Fifth round proper ==
Matches played weekend of 17 February, with replays on 20 February and 7 March.

The biggest surprises of the round saw Tranmere Rovers complete one of the greatest FA Cup comebacks ever when they beat Southampton 4–3 in a replay after they had been trailing 3–0 at half time. (with 36-year-old former Southampton striker Paul Rideout scoring a hat-trick for Tranmere), while Wycombe Wanderers reached the quarter-finals for the first time in their history with a penalty shoot-out win over Wimbledon that follow two 2–2 draws.

17 February 2001	Bolton Wanderers (2)	1–1	Blackburn Rovers (2)	Bolton
	Ricketts 62'	Report	Flitcroft (yellow card) (yellow-red card) 10'; Dunn 40'	Stadium: Reebok Stadium; Attendance: 22,048; Referee: David Pugh

7 March 2001 Replay	Blackburn Rovers (2)	3–0	Bolton Wanderers (2)	Blackburn
	Flitcroft 56'; Hignett 73' (pen.), 80'	Report		Stadium: Ewood Park; Attendance: 20,318; Referee: Mark Halsey

17 February 2001	Leicester City (1)	3–0	Bristol City (3)	Leicester
	Sturridge 10'; Hill 15' (o.g.); Izzet 83' (pen.)	Report		Stadium: Filbert Street; Attendance: 20,905; Referee: Paul Durkin

17 February 2001	Southampton (1)	0–0	Tranmere Rovers (2)	Southampton
		Report		Stadium: The Dell; Attendance: 15,232; Referee: Steve Dunn

20 February 2001 Replay	Tranmere Rovers (2)	4–3	Southampton (1)	Birkenhead
	Rideout 59', 71', 80'; Barlow 83'	Report	Kachloul 12'; Tessem 26'; Richards 45'	Stadium: Prenton Park; Attendance: 12,910; Referee: Steve Dunn

17 February 2001	Sunderland (1)	0–1	West Ham United (1)	Sunderland
		Report	Kanouté 76'	Stadium: Stadium of Light; Attendance: 36,005; Referee: Alan Wiley

17 February 2001	Tottenham Hotspur (1)	4–0	Stockport County (2)	Tottenham
	King 5'; Davies 30', 50'; Flynn 44' (o.g.)	Report		Stadium: White Hart Lane; Attendance: 36,040; Referee: Clive Wilkes

17 February 2001	Wycombe Wanderers (3)	2–2	Wimbledon (2)	Wycombe
	Simpson 72'; Brown 80'	Report	Williams 32'; Agyemang 44'	Stadium: Adams Park; Attendance: 9,650; Referee: Eddie Wolstenholme

20 February 2001 Replay	Wimbledon (2)	2–2 (a.e.t.) (7–8 p)	Wycombe Wanderers (3)	London
	Ainsworth 11'; Gray 91'	Report	Carroll 30'; Simpson (yellow card) (yellow-red card) 68'; McCarthy 120'	Stadium: Selhurst Park; Attendance: 9,464; Referee: Eddie Wolstenholme

18 February 2001	Arsenal (1)	3–1	Chelsea (1)	London
	Henry 52' (pen.); Wiltord 74', 85'	Report	Hasselbaink 62'	Stadium: Highbury; Attendance: 38,096; Referee: Graham Barber

18 February 2001	Liverpool (1)	4–2	Manchester City (1)	Liverpool
	Litmanen 7' (pen.); Heskey 13'; Šmicer 54' (pen.); Babbel 85'	Report	Kanchelskis 29'; Goater 90'	Stadium: Anfield; Attendance: 36,231; Referee: Graham Poll

== Sixth round proper ==
Matches were played on 10 & 11 March.

The most significant result of the round was Premier League side Leicester City's 2–1 home defeat to Division Two underdogs Wycombe Wanderers, who had only been in the Football League for eight seasons.

Blackburn Rovers and Tranmere Rovers, the last remaining Division One sides in the competition, were eliminated at this stage by Arsenal and Liverpool respectively.

10 March 2001

Arsenal (1)	3–0	Blackburn Rovers (2)
Wiltord 2'; Adams 5'; Pires 36'	Report

Highbury, London
Attendance: 36,304
Referee: Jeff Winter

10 March 2001

Leicester City (1)	1–2	Wycombe Wanderers (3)
Izzet 68'	Report	McCarthy 50'; Essandoh 90'

Filbert Street, Leicester
Attendance: 21,969
Referee: Steve Bennett

11 March 2001

Tranmere Rovers (2)	2–4	Liverpool (1)
Yates 47'; Allison 58'	Report	Murphy 12'; Owen 27'; Gerrard 52'; Fowler 82' (pen.)

Prenton Park, Birkenhead
Attendance: 16,342
Referee: Alan Wiley

11 March 2001

West Ham United (1)	2–3	Tottenham Hotspur (1)
Pearce 43'; Todorov 72'	Report	Rebrov 31', 57'; Doherty 62'

Boleyn Ground, London
Attendance: 26,048
Referee: Andy D'Urso

== Semi-finals ==
Unlike earlier rounds, matches were played on neutral grounds on Sunday, 8 April 2001.

8 April 2001
13:30

Arsenal (1)	2–1	Tottenham Hotspur (1)
Vieira 33'; Pires 74'	Report	Doherty 14'

Old Trafford, Manchester
Attendance: 63,541
Referee: Graham Poll (Hertfordshire)

8 April 2001
16:00

Wycombe Wanderers (3)	1–2	Liverpool (1)
Ryan 88'	Report	Heskey 78'; Fowler 83'

Villa Park, Birmingham
Attendance: 40,037
Referee: Paul Durkin (Dorset)

== Final ==
A 72nd-minute goal by Freddie Ljungberg looked to have won the trophy for Arsenal and ended their three-year trophy drought, but two late goals from Michael Owen gave the trophy to a Liverpool side who had already won the League Cup and would then go on to win the UEFA Cup as well. This success made Liverpool only the second side to win the FA Cup and League Cup in the same season - the first being Arsenal in 1993. This was the beginning of a streak in which Arsenal reached the final four times out of five, winning three of those.

12 May 2001
15:00 BST

Arsenal	1–2	Liverpool
Ljungberg 72'	Report	Owen 83', 88'

Millennium Stadium, Cardiff
Attendance: 72,500
Referee: Steve Dunn (Gloucestershire)

== Media coverage ==
In the United Kingdom, ITV were the free to air broadcasters for the fourth consecutive and final season before the BBC regained it while Sky Sports were the subscription broadcasters for the thirteenth consecutive season.

The matches shown live on ITV Sport were:

- Newcastle United 1-1 Aston Villa (R3)
- Manchester United 0-1 West Ham United (R4)
- Liverpool 4-2 Manchester City (R5)
- Tranmere Rovers 2-4 Liverpool (QF)
- Wycombe Wanderers 1-2 Liverpool (SF)
- Arsenal 1-2 Liverpool (Final)

The matches shown live on Sky Sports were:

- Luton Town 1-0 Rushden & Diamonds (R1)
- Cardiff City 5-1 Bristol Rovers (R1)
- Nuneaton Borough 1-0 Stoke City (R1 Replay)
- Walsall 2-1 Barnet (R2)
- Blackpool 0-1 Yeovil Town (R2)
- Leyton Orient 3-2 Northwich Victoria (R2 Replay)
- Fulham 1-2 Manchester United (R3)
- Bradford City 0-1 Middlesbrough (R3)
- Leeds United 0-2 Liverpool (R4)
- Gillingham 2-4 Chelsea (R4)
- Kingstonian 0-1 Bristol City (R4 Replay)
- Sunderland 0-1 West Ham United (R5)
- Arsenal 3-1 Chelsea (R5)
- Tranmere Rovers 4-3 Southampton (R5 Replay)
- West Ham United 2-3 Tottenham Hotspur (QF)
- Arsenal 2-1 Tottenham Hotspur (SF)
- Arsenal 1-2 Liverpool (Final)

The third round replay between Dagenham & Redbridge vs. Charlton Athletic was originally scheduled to be on Sky Sports on 17 January 2001, but because of a frozen pitch, the game was postponed.
