= Essandoh =

Essandoh is a surname. Notable people with the surname include:

- Ato Essandoh (born 1972), American actor
- Roy Essandoh (born 1976), Northern Ireland footballer
