= High Wych =

Village and civil parish in East Hertfordshire, England

Coordinates: 51.808863°N 0.120776°E

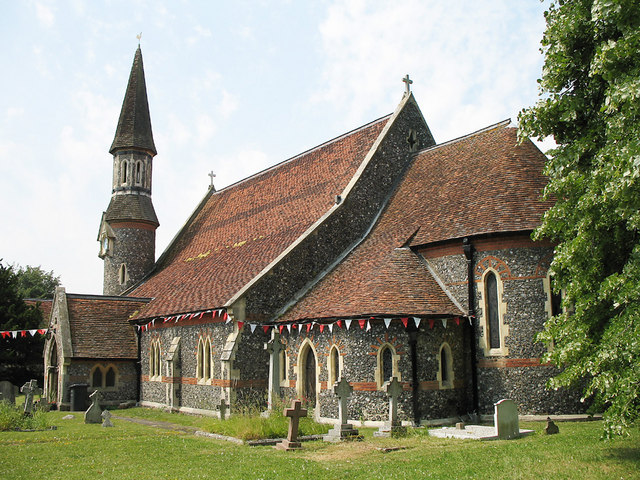
- St James Church, High Wych

- Location within Hertfordshire
- Population: 841 (Parish, 2021)
- OS grid reference: TL463143
- Civil parish: High Wych
- District: East Hertfordshire
- Shire county: Hertfordshire
- Region: East
- Country: England
- Sovereign state: United Kingdom
- Post town: SAWBRIDGEWORTH
- Postcode district: CM21
- Dialling code: 01279
- Police: Hertfordshire
- Fire: Hertfordshire
- Ambulance: East of England
- UK Parliament: Hertford and Stortford

High Wych is a village and civil parish in the East Hertfordshire district of Hertfordshire, England. The village is located a little over one mile south-west of the town of Sawbridgeworth, and around three miles north-east of Harlow in the neighbouring county of Essex. At the 2021 census the parish had a population of 841.

The parish includes the settlements of Great Pennys, Trimms Green, Sacombs Ash, Allens Green, Chandlers, Carters, Rook End, Hoskins and Sayes Park. The village contains a Church of England primary school and a late 19th-century church, St James, with a marble reredos and a Father Willis organ. A moated site is all that remains of the medieval residence of Mathams. There is also a Georgian historical house called the Manor of Groves which is now a hotel.

High Wych was historically part of the parish of Sawbridgeworth. It became a separate ecclesiastical parish in 1862. High Wych remained part of the civil parish of Sawbridgeworth until 1 April 1901 when it also became a separate civil parish.

== See also ==
- The Hundred Parishes
