= George Clegg =

English footballer (born 1980)

Personal information
- Full name: George Gerald Clegg
- Date of birth: 16 November 1980 (age 45)
- Place of birth: Manchester, England
- Height: 1.78 m (5 ft 10 in)
- Position: Forward

Team information
- Current team: Northwich Victoria

Youth career
- 1997–1999: Manchester United

Senior career*
Years	Team	Apps	(Gls)
1999–2001	Manchester United	0	(0)
1999–2000	→ Royal Antwerp (loan)	2	(0)
2001	→ Wycombe Wanderers (loan)	10	(0)
2001–2004	Bury	68	(9)
2004–2005	Northwich Victoria	?	(?)
2005–2008	Worcester City	?	(?)
2008–2011	Hinckley United	?	(?)
2011–	Northwich Victoria	?	(?)
- * Club domestic league appearances and goals as of 18:09, 21 March 2020 (UTC)

George Gerald Clegg (born 16 November 1980) is an English footballer who played in the Football League for Wycombe Wanderers and Bury and now plays for Northwich Victoria.

== Career ==
Born in Manchester, Clegg began his football career with Manchester United. Having already made 11 appearances and scored four goals for the club's Junior B team, he signed a trainee contract as a 16-year-old in June 1997. He became a regular in the Junior and Youth sides in 1997–98, and by 1998–99, he had progressed to the reserve team. In May 1999, he played in the first leg and was named as a substitute in the second leg of United's 3–1 aggregate win over Oldham Athletic in the final of the Manchester Senior Cup.

In October 1999, Clegg was sent out on loan to United's feeder club, Royal Antwerp, in order to gain some first team experience. However, during the six months that he was out there, he made just two appearances, and he returned in April 2000. The following season, Clegg progressed to the fringes of the reserve team, making six appearances and scoring three goals before being loaned out again in March 2001, this time to Wycombe Wanderers. In two months at Wycombe, Clegg made 11 appearances (ten in the league), but was unable to get on the scoresheet. He returned to Manchester United in May 2001, but he was deemed surplus to requirements for the 2001–02 season and was allowed to join Bury on a free transfer.

In his first season with Bury, Clegg scored four goals in 33 matches, as the club was relegated to the Third Division. He got a slightly better return in 2002–03, scoring six goals in 36 appearances, helping the Shakers to a play-off spot by finishing in seventh place in the league. However, they were beaten 3–1 on aggregate by Bournemouth in the semi-finals. Clegg's appearances became more sporadic in 2003–04, and he failed to get on the scoresheet in any of the eight matches in which he played.

At the end of the 2003–04 season, Clegg was released from his contract with Bury, and went on trial with Linfield in Northern Ireland over the summer of 2004. However, he did not impress manager David Jeffrey, and was not offered a contract with the club. Fortunately for Clegg, he was picked up by Northwich Victoria in September 2004.

In 2005, Clegg signed for Worcester City, founder members of the newly formed Conference North, and helped them to a seventh-place finish in his first season. Over the next three seasons, Worcester gradually slipped down the table, finishing in eighth, ninth and 12th in 2005–06, 2006–07 and 2007–08 respectively. For the 2008–09 season, the Conference North and Conference South were reorganised, and Worcester City were placed in the south section. Being based in Manchester, that made commuting to matches difficult for Clegg, and he was transferred to Hinckley United in July 2008.
