= Andy Baird =

Scottish footballer

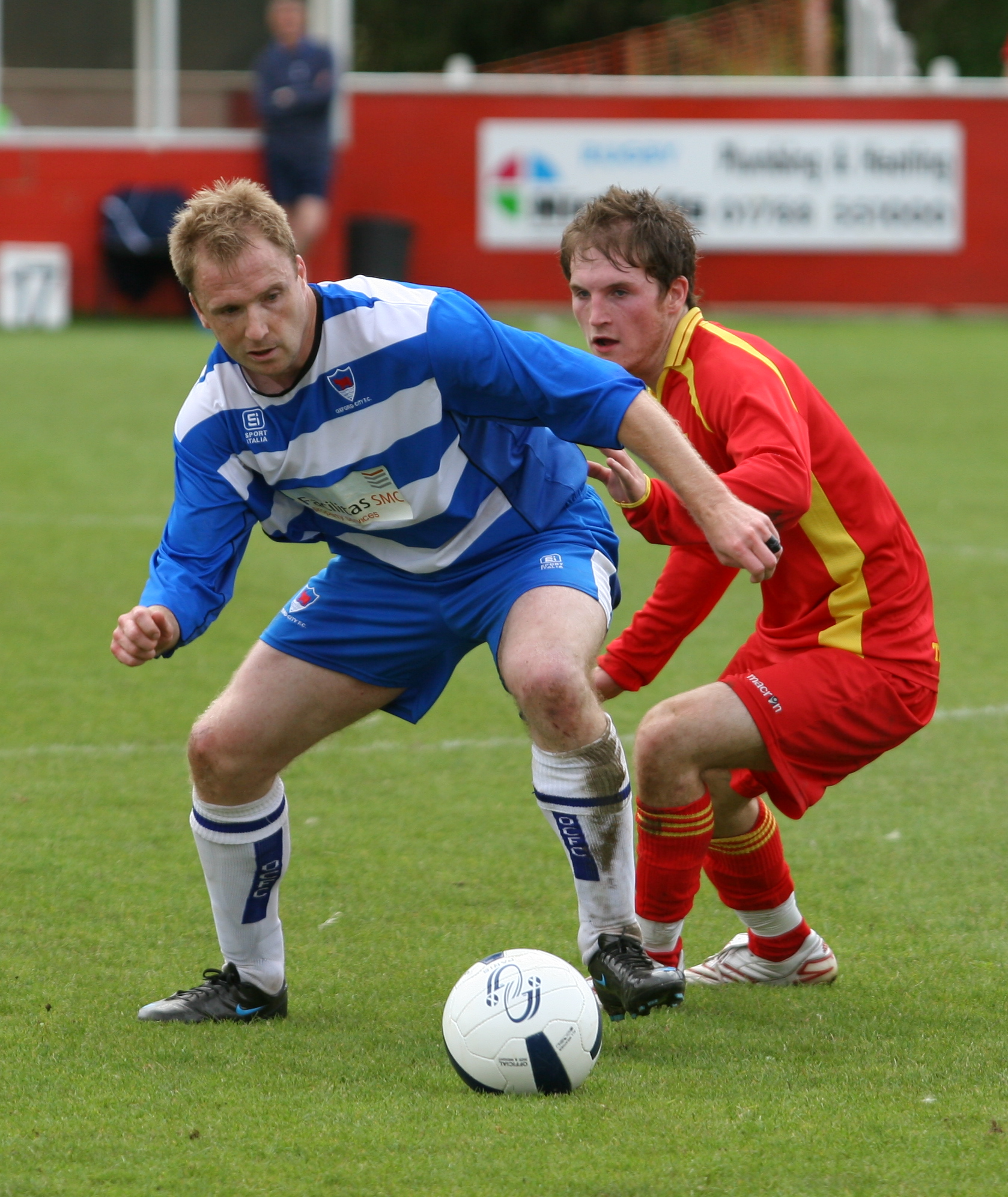
- Baird (left) in Oxford City strip

Personal information
- Full name: Andrew Baird
- Date of birth: 18 January 1979 (age 47)
- Place of birth: East Kilbride, Scotland
- Positions: Central defender; forward

Team information
- Current team: Evesham United

Youth career
- –1998: Wycombe Wanderers

Senior career*
Years	Team	Apps	(Gls)
1998–2002	Wycombe Wanderers	79	(13)
2002–2005	Brackley Town		
2005–2008	Banbury United		
2008–2010	Oxford City		
2024–	Evesham United		
- * Club domestic league appearances and goals

Andy Baird (born 18 January 1979) is a Scottish former professional footballer who plays for Evesham United. He is capable of playing at centre forward or centre back.

== Career ==
Baird was born in East Kilbride, Scotland, but began his professional career in England as a trainee with Wycombe Wanderers. He made his debut on 25 April 1998, whilst still a trainee, coming on as a late substitute for Mark Stallard in the 1–1 draw at home to Chesterfield.

He turned professional the following summer and soon established himself in the first team. However, a series of injuries later restricted his appearances and in the summer of 2002 he was released by the club because he was too prone to injuries.

He joined Brackley Town where he found that a first team place was hard to come by. However, in 2005 he joined Banbury United where he has become an integral member of the team. In 2008, he transferred to Oxford City. He departed the club in 2010 due to work commitments.

In March 2024, Baird came out of retirement at the age of 45 to sign registration forms with Southern Football League Division One South club Evesham United.

== Coaching career ==
In June 2023, Baird was appointed as first-team coach of Evesham United Ladies.
