= Matthew Brady (footballer) =

English footballer

Personal information
- Full name: Matthew Brady
- Date of birth: 27 October 1977 (age 49)
- Place of birth: London, England
- Position: Midfielder

Senior career*
Years	Team	Apps	(Gls)
1994–1998	Barnet	10	(0)
1997	→ Aylesbury United (loan)		
1998	→ Dover Athletic (loan)		
1998–1999	Boreham Wood		
1999–2001	Wycombe Wanderers	12	(2)
- * Club domestic league appearances and goals

Matthew Brady (born 27 October 1977) is an English former footballer who played as a midfielder in the English Football League for Barnet and Wycombe Wanderers, making 22 league appearances and scoring two goals. He also had loan spells with Aylesbury United (1997) and Dover Athletic (1998), and later appeared in non-league football for Boreham Wood.
