= Michael Mahoney-Johnson =

English footballer

Personal information
- Full name: Michael Anthony Mahoney-Johnson
- Date of birth: 6 November 1976 (age 49)
- Place of birth: Paddington, England
- Position: Forward

Senior career*
Years	Team	Apps	(Gls)
1996–2000	Queens Park Rangers	3	(0)
1996–1997	→ Wycombe Wanderers (loan)	4	(2)
1997–1998	→ Brighton & Hove Albion (loan)	4	(0)
- Chesham United
- * Club domestic league appearances and goals

Michael Anthony Mahoney-Johnson (born 6 November 1976) is an English former professional footballer who played in the Football League for Queens Park Rangers, Brighton & Hove Albion and Wycombe Wanderers.

Mahoney-Johnson played no League football after injuring his knee in a friendly match between QPR and the Jamaica national team in March 1998. He scored two League goals, both in a 6–3 defeat away to Peterborough United while on loan to Wycombe Wanderers.
