= Ian Simpemba =

Irish footballer

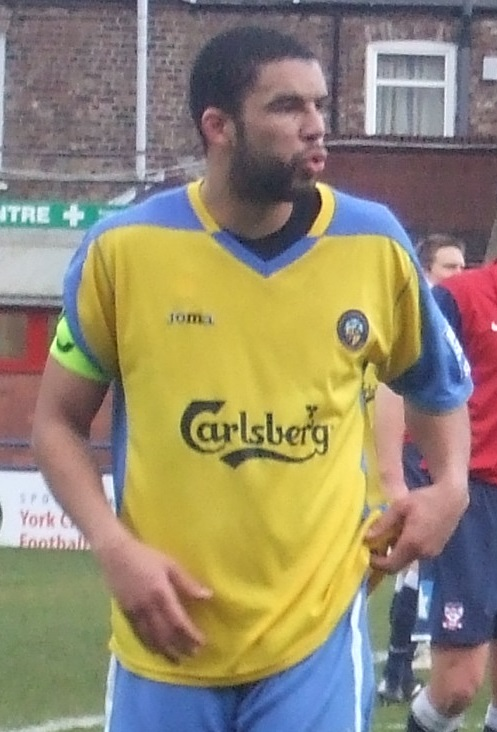
- Simpemba playing for Havant & Waterlooville in 2009

Personal information
- Full name: Ian Frederick Simpemba
- Date of birth: 28 March 1983 (age 43)
- Place of birth: Dublin, Ireland
- Height: 6 ft 2 in (1.88 m)
- Position: Defender

Senior career*
Years	Team	Apps	(Gls)
2001–2004	Wycombe Wanderers	20	(2)
2002–2003	→ Woking (loan)	14	(0)
2003	→ Woking (loan)	5	(0)
2004–2006	Crawley Town	65	(0)
2006	→ Aldershot Town (loan)	10	(0)
2006–2008	Lewes	82	(7)
2008–2011	Havant & Waterlooville	116	(8)
2011–2012	Ebbsfleet United	20	(0)
2012–2013	Dover Athletic	49	(4)
2013–2018	Eastbourne Borough	184	(7)
Total		565	(28)
- * Club domestic league appearances and goals

Ian Frederick Simpemba (born 28 March 1983) is an Irish former Professional footballer who most recently played for Eastbourne Borough as a defender. Simpemba played for Wycombe Wanderers in the Football League Second Division in the 2002–03 and 2003–04 seasons. Simpemba signed for Eastbourne Borough in September 2013 and was made club captain. Simpemba was club captain until 2017, after that he became a Player-Coach at the club.

== Career statistics ==
As of match played 20 October 2018

Appearances and goals by club, season and competition
Club	Season	League			FA Cup		League Cup		Other		Total	
Club	Season	Division	Apps	Goals	Apps	Goals	Apps	Goals	Apps	Goals	Apps	Goals
Wycombe Wanderers	2002–03	Second Division	1	0	0	0	0	0	0	0	1	0
Wycombe Wanderers	2003–04	Second Division	19	2	2	0	0	0	1 (Note: Appearance(s) in Football League Trophy)	0	22	2
Wycombe Wanderers	Total		20	2	2	0	0	0	1	0	23	2
Woking (loan)	2002–03	Football Conference	14	0	2	0	—		1	0	17	0
Woking (loan)	2003–04	Football Conference	5	0	0	0	—		0	0	5	0
Woking (loan)	Total		19	0	2	0	—		1	0	22	0
Crawley Town	2004–05	Conference National	39	0	0	0	—		3 (Note: Appearance(s) in FA Trophy)	0	42	0
Crawley Town	2005–06	Conference National	26	0	0	0	—		3	0	29	0
Crawley Town	Total		65	0	0	0	—		6	0	71	0
Aldershot Town	2005–06	Conference National	10	0	0	0	—		0	0	10	0
Lewes	2006–07	Conference South	41	2	4	0	—		2	0	47	2
Lewes	2007–08	Conference South	41	5	5	1	—		2 (Note: Appearance(s) in Conference League Cup)	1	48	7
Lewes	Total		82	7	9	1	—		4	1	95	9
Havant & Waterlooville	2008–09	Conference South	41	2	5	4	—		8 (Note: Three appearances in Conference League Cup, five appearances and two goals in FA Trophy)	2	54	8
Havant & Waterlooville	2009–10	Conference South	37	6	2	0	—		1	0	40	6
Havant & Waterlooville	2010–11	Conference South	38	0	4	0	—		2	0	44	0
Havant & Waterlooville	Total		116	8	11	4	—		11	2	138	14
Ebbsfleet United	2011–12	Conference Premier	20	0	1	0	—		0	0	21	0
Dover Athletic	2011–12	Conference South	17	2	0	0	—		0	0	17	2
Dover Athletic	2012–13	Conference South	32	2	0	0	—		3 (Note: Appearance(s) in Conference South play-offs)	1	35	3
Dover Athletic	Total		49	4	0	0	—		3	1	52	5
Eastbourne Borough	2013–14	Conference South	40	2	2	0	—		2 (Note: One appearance in FA Trophy, one appearance in Sussex Senior Challenge Cup)	0	44	2
Eastbourne Borough	2014–15	Conference South	37	2	5	0	—		3 (Note: One appearance in FA Trophy, two appearances in Sussex Senior Challenge Cup)	0	45	2
Eastbourne Borough	2015–16	National League South	37	2	3	0	—		6 (Note: Four appearances and one goal in FA Trophy, two appearances in Sussex Senior Challenge Cup)	1	46	3
Eastbourne Borough	2016–17	National League South	35	0	2	0	—		6 (Note: Two appearances and one goal in FA Trophy, three appearances in Sussex Senior Challenge Cup, one appearance in Sussex Community Shield)	1	43	1
Eastbourne Borough	2017–18	National League South	33	1	2	0	—		5 (Note: Three appearances in FA Trophy, two appearances in Sussex Senior Challenge Cup)	0	40	1
Eastbourne Borough	2018–19	National League South	2	0	2	0	—		0	0	4	0
Eastbourne Borough	Total		184	7	16	0	—		22	2	222	9
Career total			565	28	41	5	0	0	48	6	654	39
