= Manor of Groves =

Country house in High Wych, Hertfordshire, England

Coordinates: 51.8124°N 0.1156°E

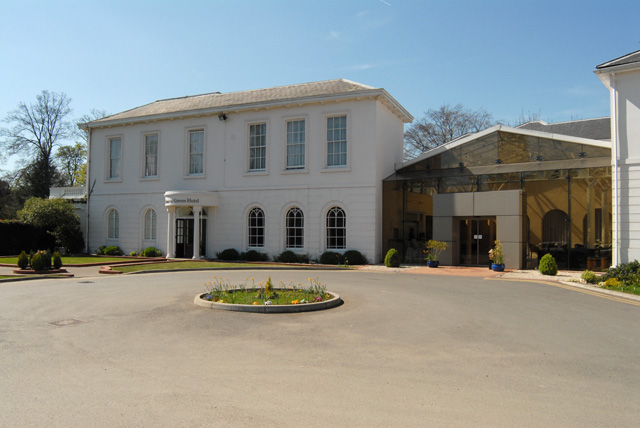
Manor of Groves Hotel

The Manor of Groves Hotel (formerly Grove Lodge) in High Wych, near Sawbridgeworth in Hertfordshire is a building of historical significance and is listed as Grade II on the English Heritage Register. It was remodelled over an existing older building in 1823 by a prominent London lawyer. The house was a private residence for many distinguished people over the next 150 years and in 1988 was converted to a hotel. It still serves this function and provides accommodation, dining facilities and caters for events such as conferences and weddings. There is also a golf course.

== Early history ==
The Manor of Groves dates back to ancient times. The Victoria History of the County of Hertford describes its history in the following terms.

"The Manor of Groves comprised the land given by Henry Fitzgerald to the abbey of St. Mary, Reading, probably in the second half of the 12th century. After the Dissolution the manor was granted in 1544 to William Gooding or Goodwin of Writtle, co. Essex. He sold it in 1549 to Robert Gooday. It descended to Thomas Gooday, who conveyed it in 1571 to Robert Hirst. The latter died in 1548, his heir being his nephew Henry, son of his brother John. Henry Hirst sold in 1594 to John Duke, who held it until his death in 1606. In the inquisition taken at his death the manor is called Sawbridgeworth alias Groves, the first time that the latter name appears. Robert Duke, his son, is said by Chauncy to have granted the manor in 1628 to his own son John Duke, rector of High Roding, co. Essex, who married Joyce Bennet. Robert son of John sold the manor in 1665 to his mother Joyce, who in 1671 conveyed it to Thomas Rogers. John Rogers, son of Thomas, sold it in 1693 to Edmund Godwin of Eastwick, and from the latter it was bought in 1702 by Anne Mary Godfrey, widow. It descended to Peter Godfrey. In 1742 it was in the possession of Eliott Taylor of whose heirs it was bought by Thomas Nathaniel Williams."

== The Georgian Era ==
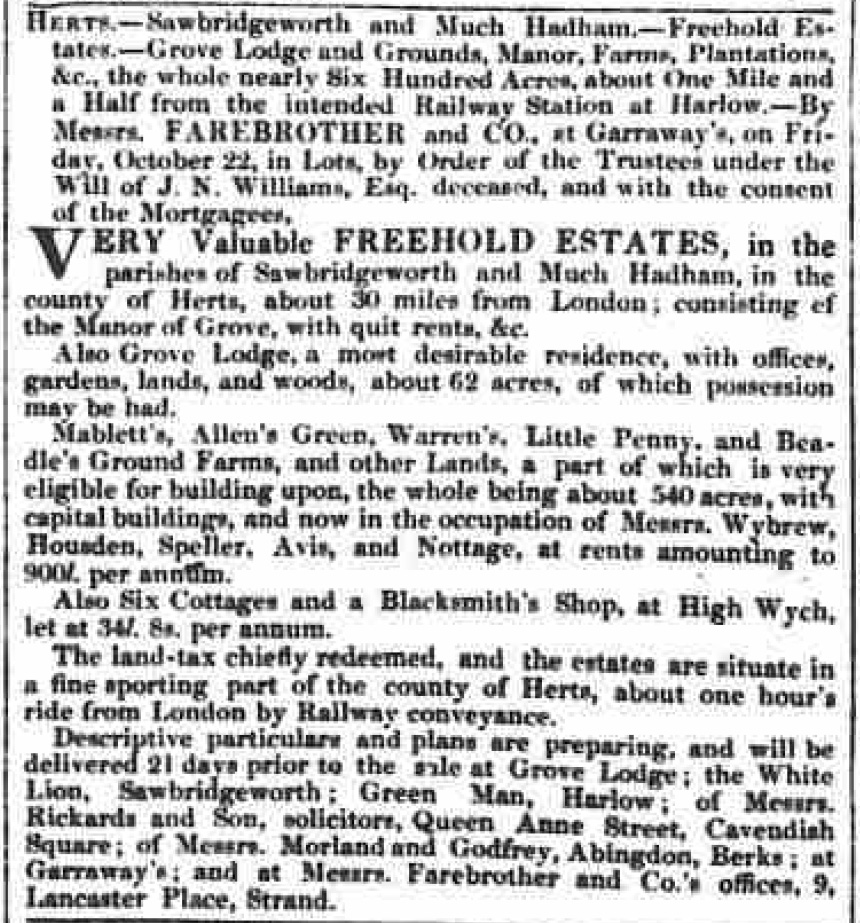
Advertisement for the sale of the Grove Lodge in 1841

When Thomas Nathaniel Williams (1781-1841) bought the Manor in about 1823 he made major alterations and additions to an existing house which gave the building its Georgian appearance which can still be seen. It is a fine neo-classical small country house.

Thomas was born in 1781 in Shoreditch, London. He became a lawyer and had an office in London. In 1805 he married Catherine Jeffery. It appears that the Manor of Groves was his country house as Thomas continued to practise law in London after it was built. He died in 1841 and the house was advertised for sale in the same year. The advertisement is shown. The house was bought by Jones De'ath. He was born in Hunsdon, Hertfordshire in 1802; his father William was a miller. Jones became a farmer and lived with his widowed father in Little Parndon until he bought the Manor of Groves. In 1852 at the age of 50 he married Mary Barnard who was the same age. He continued his farming when he moved to the house. In 1873 Mary died and Jones continued to live at the house until his death in 1891 at the age of 89. The house was advertised for sale and the advertisement is shown.

== Recent history ==
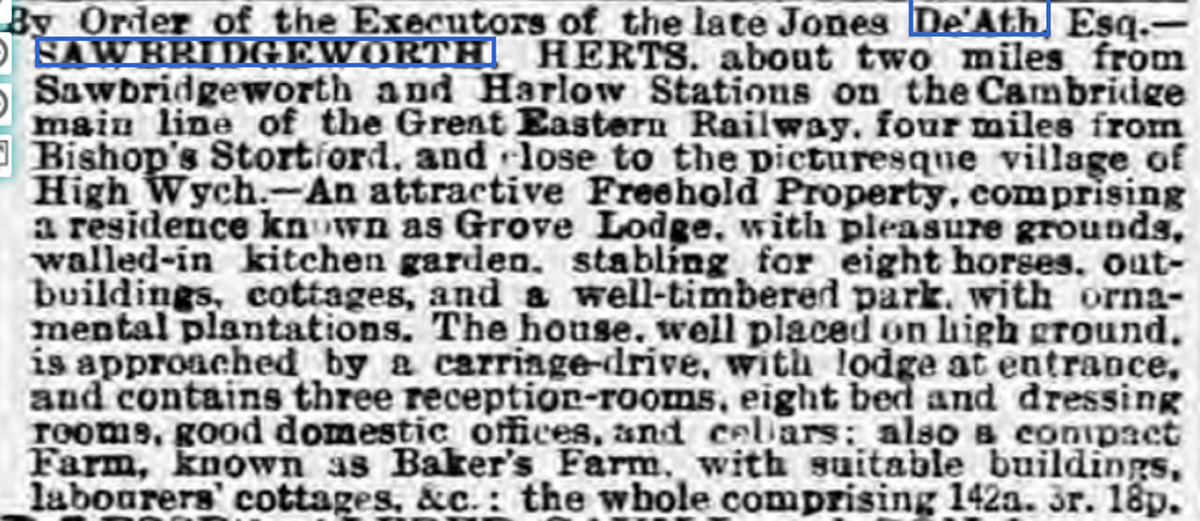
Advertisement for the sale of the property in 1892

Edmund Broughton Barnard who was one of Mary’s nephews bought the house. Edmund was a prominent politician. He was born in 1856 in Sawbridgeworth and was the son of William Barnard, a wealthy miller and brewer who lived in Fair Green House in Sawbridgeworth. He was educated at Brighton School and the University of Cambridge where he was reputed to be an excellent polo player. In 1887 he married Alice Maud Richardson who was the daughter of Charles Richardson, of Torwood, Wimbledon Park. They had a very large wedding which was extensively reported in the newspapers. Edmund later became the Member of Parliament for Kidderminster. In about 1903 Edmund sold the Manor of Groves and moved to Fair Green House in Sawbridgeworth which was his childhood home.

Frederic Silva (1841-1926) bought the property and moved there with his wife, one son and two daughters. Frederic was born in 1841 in London. He was the son of John Joseph Silva, a wealthy merchant. In 1875, he married Anna, daughter of Richard Wheen. Silva became a starch manufacturer. The family lived at the Manor of Groves for about ten years and in about 1915 moved to Coram Tower in Lyme Regis. The property was bought by Henry Fowell Buxton.

Henry Fowell Buxton (1876-1949) was born in 1876 in Cheshunt, Hertfordshire. His father was John Henry Buxton who was a director in the family brewing company of Truman, Hanbury and Buxton. He was educated at Harrow and Cambridge University and joined the family company where he became a director. He fought in the First World War and gained the rank of captain in the service of the 4th Battalion, Suffolk Regiment. In 1900 he married Katharine Tayspel Round and the couple had five sons. In 1934 Henry’s father died and he and his wife moved to his estate in Ware leaving the Manor of Groves to be managed by his eldest son Major John Fowell Buxton (1902-1970).

John Fowell Buxton was born in 1902 in Sewardstone, Essex. Like his father he was educated at Harrow and Cambridge. After he graduated he began to manage the estate at the Manor of Groves. In 1930 he married Katherine Mary Bacon who was the daughter of Sir Nicholas Bacon 12th Baronet. The couple had six children, five daughters and one son. In about 1957 John sold the Manor of Groves to Cyril Reginald Egerton.

Cyril Reginald Egerton (1905-1992) was born in 1905 in London. He was the son of Major Hon. Francis William George Egerton and Hilda Margaret Curteis. He married, firstly, Mary Campbell, daughter of Rt Hon. Sir Ronald Hugh Campbell, on 8 December 1934. He married, secondly, Mary Truda Lea, daughter of Sir Thomas Sydney Lea, 2nd Bt. The couple had four children. Cyril sold the house in 1965 to the Scott family. In 1988 it was converted to a hotel.
