= Damien Markman =

English footballer (born 1978)

Personal information
- Date of birth: 7 January 1978 (age 48)
- Place of birth: Bracknell, England
- Position: Forward

Senior career*
Years	Team	Apps	(Gls)
1994–1995	Slough Town		
1995–1997	Wycombe Wanderers	4	(0)
1997	RoPS		
1997–1998	Harrow Borough		
1998	Yeading		
1999	Bracknell Town		
1999–2000	Harrow Borough		
2000–2002	Slough Town	32	(4)
2001	→ Egham Town (loan)		
2002	→ Boreham Wood (loan)		
2002–2004	Beaconsfield SYCOB		
2004	Braintree Town	0	(0)
2004–2006	Sutton Coldfield Town		
2006–2008	Redditch United		
2007	→ Bromsgrove Rovers (loan)	4	(2)
2010–	Singh Sabha Slough		
- * Club domestic league appearances and goals

Damien Markman (born 7 January 1978) is an English former professional footballer who played in The Football League for Wycombe Wanderers.
