= Tony Clark (footballer) =

English footballer

Personal information
- Full name: Anthony John Clark
- Date of birth: 7 April 1977 (age 49)
- Place of birth: Lambeth, London, England
- Height: 5 ft 7 in (1.70 m)
- Position: Forward

Senior career*
Years	Team	Apps	(Gls)
1995–1997	Wycombe Wanderers	4	(0)
1997–1998	Hendon		
2000–2003	Newport Pagnell Town		
2003	Buckingham Town		
- * Club domestic league appearances and goals

Anthony John Clark (born 7 April 1977) is an English former professional footballer who played as a forward for Wycombe Wanderers in the Football League.
