= Brett Darby =

English footballer

Personal information
- Date of birth: 10 November 1983 (age 42)
- Place of birth: Leicester, England
- Position: Midfielder

Team information
- Current team: Shepshed Dynamo

Youth career
- Ratby & Groby

Senior career*
Years	Team	Apps	(Gls)
2000–2003	Leicester City	0	(0)
2003	Southend United	10	(0)
2003–2004	Tamworth	26	(0)
2004	Grantham Town	14	(0)
2004–2007	Corby Town	?	(?)
2007–2008	Stamford	?	(?)
2008–2009	Quorn	?	(?)
2009–2010	Rothwell Town	?	(?)
2014–	Shepshed Dynamo		
- * Club domestic league appearances and goals as of 00:12, 13 July 2007 (UTC)

Brett Darby (born 10 November 1983) is a former professional footballer who played in the Football League as a midfielder for Southend United.
