= Paul Read (footballer) =

English footballer (born 1973)

Personal information
- Full name: Paul Colin Read
- Date of birth: 25 September 1973 (age 53)
- Place of birth: Harlow, England
- Position: Striker

Youth career
- 1991–1995: Arsenal

Senior career*
Years	Team	Apps	(Gls)
1995–1997	Arsenal	0	(0)
1995	→ Leyton Orient (loan)	11	(0)
1995	→ Southend United (loan)	4	(1)
1996	→ Albany Alleycats (loan)		
1997–1999	Wycombe Wanderers	59	(9)
1999	Östersunds FK	25	(18)
1999–2000	Luton Town	0	(0)
2000–2002	Exeter City	26	(1)
- Fleet Town
Total		125	(29)
- * Club domestic league appearances and goals

Paul Colin Read (born 25 September 1973) is an English retired professional footballer who made 100 league appearances in English football, as a striker, also playing in the United States and Sweden.

== Career ==
Born in Harlow, Read began his career as an apprentice at Arsenal, but he never made a league appearance for the Gunners. While at Arsenal, Read spent loan spells at Leyton Orient and Southend United. He also spent time with the Albany Alleycats.

After leaving Arsenal in 1997, Read signed for Wycombe Wanderers, and made 59 league appearances. He left Wycombe in 1999, and spent a season in Sweden with Östersunds FK, before returning to England with Luton Town, where he made one Football League Trophy appearance. Read then signed for Exeter City, making 26 league appearances. He finished his career with Fleet Town.
