= Richard Thompson (footballer, born 1974) =

English footballer

Personal information
- Full name: Richard Omar Thompson
- Date of birth: 2 May 1974 (age 52)
- Place of birth: Balham, England
- Position: Midfielder

Youth career
- Wimbledon

Senior career*
Years	Team	Apps	(Gls)
1997–1998	Dulwich Hamlet		
–1999	Crawley Town		
1999–2000	Wycombe Wanderers	6	(0)
1999–2000	→ Kingstonian (loan)	2	(0)
2000–200?	Sutton United		
- Carshalton Athletic
2002	Hampton & Richmond Borough		
2002	Bromley		
2002–2003	Hampton & Richmond Borough		
Total		8	(0)
- * Club domestic league appearances and goals

Richard Omar Thompson (born 2 May 1974) is a former professional footballer who played in The Football League for Wycombe Wanderers.

== Career ==
He was previously a youth player at Wimbledon. He played for Dulwich Hamlet during the 1997–98 season.

Thompson scored his first goal for Crawley Town against Dorchester Town in February 1999. After his spell at Crawley Town, Thompson joined Wycombe Wanderers on an 18-month contract in March 1999 after two trial matches with Wycombe's reserves. He had a loan spell at Kingstonian, for whom he made two appearances, before leaving Wycombe at the end of the 1999–2000 season, having made 6 appearances.

He subsequently had spells at Sutton United, and Carshalton Athletic.

He joined Bromley in summer 2002 after a short spell with Hampton & Richmond Borough, before rejoining Hampton & Richmond later that year, who he left in March 2003.
