= Leeyon Phelan =

English footballer

Personal information
- Date of birth: 6 October 1982 (age 44)
- Place of birth: Hammersmith, England
- Position: Forward

Senior career*
Years	Team	Apps	(Gls)
1999–2002	Wycombe Wanderers	3	(0)
- * Club domestic league appearances and goals

Leeyon Phelan (born 6 October 1982) is a former professional footballer who played in The Football League for Wycombe Wanderers.
