= Mark Osborn =

English footballer

Personal information
- Date of birth: 19 June 1981 (age 45)
- Place of birth: Bletchley, England
- Position: Goalkeeper

Team information
- Current team: Hemel Hempstead Town

Senior career*
Years	Team	Apps	(Gls)
1999–2003	Wycombe Wanderers	1	(0)
2002–2003	→ Farnborough Town (loan)	3	(0)
2003–2005	Farnborough Town	46	(0)
2005	Kettering Town		
2007	Histon	10	(0)
2007–2008	→ Halesowen Town		
2008	Halesowen Town		
2008–?	Corby Town	42	(0)
- Arlesey Town
2012–2013	Hemel Hempstead Town		
2013–	Winslow United	2	
- * Club domestic league appearances and goals as of 19:45, 14 June 2009 (UTC)

Mark Osborn (born 19 June 1981) is an English footballer who plays as a goalkeeper for Winslow United. He played in the Football League for Wycombe Wanderers.

== Career ==
Osborn began his career as a trainee at Wycombe Wanderers in 1999 and made four senior appearances for the club, including a League Cup tie against West Bromwich Albion in September 1999, and a Football League Second Division match against Cambridge United in October 1999.

As playing opportunities were limited at Wycombe, he joined Conference National side Farnborough Town on loan for the 2002–03 season, and then joined them on a permanent basis at the end of the season. He made 47 appearances for Farnborough Town before joining Conference North club Kettering Town in March 2005 soon after Farnborough Town manager Dean Austin was sacked. He spent two seasons at Kettering before being released at the end on the 2006–07 season, and joining Histon. He lost his place in the first team to Danny Naisbitt in September 2007 and a month later, joined Halesowen Town on a three-month loan. He then joined Halesowen Town on a permanent basis in January 2008.

He joined Corby in 2008, having been released by Halesowen Town at the end of the 2007–08 season. Osborn's performances helped Corby finish as champions of the British Gas Premier Division in the 2008–09 season. He then joined Arlesey Town.

He joined Hemel Hempstead Town for the 2012/13 season.

He signed for Winslow United in the Spartan South Midlands League Division 1 in 2013 and played his first game for Winslow United in a 3–2 defeat to Welwyn Garden City FC on Wednesday 30 January.

In his second game for Winslow United and on his home debut at 'The Gate' he kept a clean sheet in a must win game against Kentish Town in a game Winslow won 2–0 on Saturday 2 February.
