= Jason Cousins =

English footballer

Personal information
- Full name: Jason Michael Cousins
- Date of birth: 4 October 1970 (age 56)
- Place of birth: Hayes, England
- Positions: Central defender; right-back

Youth career
- Brentford

Senior career*
Years	Team	Apps	(Gls)
1989–1991	Brentford	21	(0)
1991–2002	Wycombe Wanderers	375	(7)
2002–2003	Aldershot Town	36	(7)
2003–2004	Windsor & Eton		
2005	Maidenhead United		
- * Club domestic league appearances and goals

Jason Cousins (born 4 October 1970) is an English former footballer. He played eleven years with Wycombe Wanderers, from 1991 to 2002.

== Playing career ==
Cousins graduated to the Brentford professional side in July 1989, making 21 Third Division appearances over the next two seasons.

In July 1991 he dropped into the Conference National to play for Martin O'Neill's Wycombe Wanderers. The club finished runners-up in his debut season, before they won the Conference and the FA Trophy in 1992–93. Back in the Football League, Cousins helped Wycombe to promotion to the Second Division in 1994 with their play-off final victory. This came despite his being stripped of the captaincy for a highly dangerous tackle on David Moss. He was voted the club's Player of the Season in 1994–95 and 1998–99. Remaining in the third tier for several years, he was a part of the club's remarkable FA Cup semi-final run in 2000–01, and played in the 2–1 defeat to Liverpool at Villa Park. In October 2002 he was given a testimonial match against Celtic, then managed by his former boss Martin O'Neill. Cousins made over 400 appearances for the club.

In June 2002, Cousins moved back to non-league football with Aldershot Town, where he spent one successful season as they were crowned Isthmian League Premier Division champions.

In June 2003, he moved on to Windsor & Eton, later moving on to Maidenhead United.

== After Football ==
Since retiring, Cousins has become one of Hertfordshire's well-known amateur golfers by winning titles, swindles, and establishing himself in high level societies.

Cousins also contributes to charity and recently adopted an Old English Sheepdog called Digby.

== Honours ==
Wycombe Wanderers

- Football League Third Division play-offs: 1994
- Conference National: 1992–93
- FA Trophy: 1992–93

Aldershot Town

- Isthmian League Premier Division: 2002–03

Individual

- PFA Team of the Year: 1993–94 Third Division
- Wycombe Wanderers Player of the Season: 1994–95, 1998–99

Golf

- Manor of Groves Scratch Club Championship: 2025
