= Jermaine McSporran =

English footballer

Personal information
- Date of birth: 1 January 1977 (age 49)
- Place of birth: Manchester, England
- Height: 5 ft 10 in (1.78 m)
- Position: Forward

Senior career*
Years	Team	Apps	(Gls)
1995–1996	Abingdon Town	25	(19)
1996–1998	Oxford City	45	(29)
1998–2004	Wycombe Wanderers	158	(30)
2004	Walsall	6	(0)
2004–2006	Doncaster Rovers	28	(1)
2006	→ Boston United (loan)	2	(0)
2006	Chester City	1	(0)
2006	Kidlington	2	(0)
2006	Banbury United		
2006–2007	Abingdon United		
2007–2009	Oxford City		
Total		197	(31)
- * Club domestic league appearances and goals

Jermaine McSporran (born 1 January 1977) is an English retired footballer who last played for Oxford City in the Southern League Division One South and West, after having been released by Chester City and Banbury United in the summer of 2006.

He was signed by Chester City from Doncaster Rovers (where he scored two goals, one against Ipswich in the League Cup and one in the league against Oldham) in 2006 and has also played for Wycombe Wanderers. In March 2004 he moved to Walsall. He joined Boston United in February 2006, and also played for Abingdon United.

He works full-time in a Unipart distribution warehouse in Oxford.
