= Keith Ryan =

English footballer (born 1970)

Personal information
- Full name: Keith James Ryan
- Date of birth: 25 June 1970 (age 56)
- Place of birth: Northampton, England
- Height: 5 ft 11 in (1.80 m)
- Position: Midfielder

Team information
- Current team: Flackwell Heath (first-team coach)

Senior career*
| Years | Team | Apps | (Gls) |
| 1988–1990 | Berkhamsted Town | | |
| 1990–2006 | Wycombe Wanderers^{[A]} | 428 | (48) |

Managerial career
- 2004: Wycombe Wanderers (caretaker manager)
- * Club domestic league appearances and goals

Keith Ryan (born 25 June 1970) is an English former professional footballer who played in the Football League as a midfielder for Wycombe Wanderers. In July 2009 he was appointed reserve team manager at Queens Park Rangers.

== Career ==
Born in Northampton, Ryan started his career at Berkhamsted Town. He was one of Martin O'Neill's first singings for Wycombe Wanderers in August 1990. "Rhino", as he is nicknamed, played in over 500 games for the club and scored more than 50 goals. He would go on to be a mainstay of the Wycombe midfield of the 1990s, playing in all three of their Wembley visits, during the decade.

Ryan was awarded a testimonial on 1 August 2000 where Leicester City were the visitors. Leicester would go on to win the game 3–0, later in the season Ryan would be part of the squad that would go on to shock the Foxes 2–1 in the quarter final of the 2001 FA Cup. Before going on to score Wycombe's goal in the semi-final against Liverpool.

Following the departure of manager Tony Adams in November 2004, Ryan was appointed caretaker manager until the appointment of permanent successor John Gorman. Gorman rewarded Ryan's service to the club by making him an assistant manager, along with fellow Blues legend Steve Brown. Ryan retired from professional football in April 2006. He was retained as a coach when Paul Lambert took over as manager in June 2006, but left the club a year later when the coaching staff structure was reorganised for financial reasons.

He was promptly appointed by John Gregory, his former manager at Wycombe, as a youth team coach at Queens Park Rangers, and promoted to reserve team manager in July 2009.

As of December 2021, he was first-team coach at Flackwell Heath

== Honours ==
Wycombe Wanderers

- Football League Third Division play-offs: 1994
- FA Trophy: 1990–91, 1992–93

== Notes ==
A. The Wycombe appearance figures are for the Football League only, not for the Conference.
