= Dave Carroll =

Scottish footballer

Personal information
- Full name: David Francis Carroll
- Date of birth: 20 September 1966 (age 60)
- Place of birth: Paisley, Scotland
- Position: Midfielder

Senior career*
Years	Team	Apps	(Gls)
–1988	Ruislip Manor		
1988–2002	Wycombe Wanderers	602	(100)
2002	Aldershot Town	19	(2)
2002–2005	Windsor & Eton		
- * Club domestic league appearances and goals

David Francis Carroll (born 20 September 1966 in Paisley, Scotland) is a former footballer who spent 14 seasons at Wycombe Wanderers. An attacking midfielder, Carroll played more than 600 first-team games for Wycombe in all competitions, and scored exactly 100 goals. He was nicknamed "Jesus" by the Wycombe supporters.

Carroll joined Wycombe, then a recently promoted Conference side, in the summer of 1988, having previously played for Ruislip Manor of the Isthmian League. He went on to become a key member of the Wycombe side that won promotion to Football League in 1993. The following season, Wycombe won a second successive promotion as Carroll scored twice in Wycombe's 4–2 victory against Preston in the playoff final at Wembley.

In November 1997, Carroll was rewarded for his long service to the Chairboys with a testimonial match against Leicester City. Near the end of his career at Adams Park, no longer a first-team regular, Carroll played the final ten minutes of Wycombe's famous FA Cup semi-final against Liverpool in 2001.

In March 2002, Carroll left Wycombe on a free transfer to join Aldershot Town. He spent eight months at Aldershot, and finished his career at Windsor & Eton.

Carroll now works as Manager for Space Station plc.

== Honours ==
Wycombe Wanderers

- Football League Third Division play-offs: 1994
- FA Trophy: 1990–91, 1992–93
