= Paul McCarthy (footballer) =

Irish footballer

Personal information
- Full name: Paul Jason McCarthy
- Date of birth: 4 August 1971
- Place of birth: Cork, Ireland
- Date of death: 19 February 2017 (aged 45)
- Position: Defender

Senior career*
Years	Team	Apps	(Gls)
1989–1996	Brighton & Hove Albion	181	(6)
1996–2003	Wycombe Wanderers	212	(9)
2003	→ Oxford United (loan)	6	(1)
2003–2004	Oxford United	29	(2)
2004	Hornchurch	7	(2)
2004–2013	Ebbsfleet United	141	(6)
Total		576	(26)

International career
1989–1994	Republic of Ireland U21	10	(1)
- * Club domestic league appearances and goals

Paul Jason McCarthy (4 August 1971 – 19 February 2017) was an Irish footballer who last played for Ebbsfleet United as a defender. He made over 500 appearances in the Football League and Football Conference, notably for Brighton & Hove Albion, Wycombe Wanderers and Ebbsfleet United.

== Career ==
Born in Cork, County Cork, McCarthy began his career as a trainee with Brighton & Hove Albion, where he made over 200 league and cup appearances before joining Wycombe Wanderers for a fee of £100,000 in July 1996. He made over 250 appearances for Wycombe in seven seasons at the club, helping the club to a FA Cup semi-final against Liverpool in April 2001. He scored Wycombe's first goal in their quarter-final win over Premier League side Leicester City, paving the way for Roy Essandoh to score the winner. McCarthy joined Oxford United on loan in March 2003, joining the club on a permanent basis at the end of the season.

After 35 appearances for Oxford, he was released on a free transfer in summer 2004 and joined non-League club Hornchurch. He became available after Hornchurch ran into financial trouble and signed for Conference National club Gravesend & Northfleet (now Ebbsfleet United) in November 2004. He became club captain and by the end of the 2007–08 season, had made over 110 appearances for Ebbsfleet and collected a winners medal when Ebbsfleet won the FA Trophy in May 2008. He signed a new one-year contract with Ebbsfleet in June 2008 and a year later he was appointed as player–assistant manager at the club. Paul left Ebbsfleet in July 2013 following a change of owner at the club. He subsequently signed with Crowborough AFC on 4 August 2013.

McCarthy died suddenly on 19 February 2017, aged 45, of a suspected heart attack. His daughter is cricketer Cassidy McCarthy.

== International career ==
He played and scored for the Republic of Ireland national football team at the 1991 FIFA World Youth Championship.

== Honours ==
- FA Trophy: 2008
