= Steve Brown (footballer, born 1966) =

English footballer (born 1966)

Personal information
- Full name: Steven Ferold Brown
- Date of birth: 6 July 1966 (age 60)
- Place of birth: Northampton, England
- Position: Midfielder

Youth career
- –1983: Northampton Town

Senior career*
Years	Team	Apps	(Gls)
1983–1985	Northampton Town	15	(3)
1985–1989	Irthlingborough Diamonds		
1989–1994	Northampton Town	158	(19)
1994–2004	Wycombe Wanderers	371	(35)
Total		544	(57)

Managerial career
- 2004–2007: Wycombe Wanderers (assistant)
- 2007–2009: Queens Park Rangers (academy)
- * Club domestic league appearances and goals

Steven Ferold Brown (born 6 July 1966) is an English former professional footballer who made nearly 550 appearances as a midfielder for Northampton Town and Wycombe Wanderers. He is Head of Academy Coaching at League One club Milton Keynes Dons.

== Playing career ==
Born in Northampton, Brown started his career at Northampton Town, but left in December 1985 to join Irthlingborough Diamonds. He rejoined Northampton in July 1989 and was signed for Wycombe Wanderers in February 1994 by Martin O'Neill.

A fan favourite at the club, Brown featured in 443 games and scored 43 goals for the club in a ten-year career, and was part of the Wycombe Wanderers team that reached the semi-finals of the FA Cup in 2001.

== Managerial career ==
Brown retired as a player in May 2004 but was appointed as assistant to Wycombe manager John Gorman along with fellow Blues legend Keith Ryan in November 2004. After Gorman's switch to Northampton, there was speculation that Brown would follow as he had strong links to the club. However, Wycombe confirmed that Brown would be staying on to work with new manager Paul Lambert.

In June 2007, Brown and Ryan left the club for what the club described as "financial reasons". In July 2007, Brown was appointed by John Gregory, his former manager at Wycombe, as youth team manager at Queens Park Rangers, a post he held until 2009.

After leaving Queens Park Rangers, Brown become involved in developing football in South-east Asia and worked as a coach on Vietnamese reality TV show Soccer Prince aiming to find a future star, with a prize of a place at the Liverpool Academy.

In October 2014, Brown joined the FA as Head of Regional Talent ID. On 8 January 2018, following redundancy from his previous role with the FA, Brown joined League One club Milton Keynes Dons as Head of Academy Coaching.
