= Roy Essandoh =

Northern Irish footballer (born 1976)

Personal information
- Full name: Roy Kabina Essandoh
- Date of birth: 17 February 1976 (age 50)
- Place of birth: Belfast, Northern Ireland
- Position: Striker

Youth career
- 1993–1994: Cumbernauld United

Senior career*
Years	Team	Apps	(Gls)
1994–1997	Motherwell	5	(0)
1998	East Fife	5	(0)
1998	St. Pölten	3	(0)
1998–1999	JJK Jyväskylä	16	(5)
1999–2000	Vaasan Palloseura	50	(7)
2001	Rushden & Diamonds	2	(0)
2001	Wycombe Wanderers	13	(1)
2001	Barnet	6	(1)
2001–2002	Cambridge City	15	(3)
2002	Bishop's Stortford	5	(3)
2002	Billericay Town	15	(8)
2002–2003	Grays Athletic	19	(4)
2003–2004	Bishop's Stortford	17	(5)
2004	→ Gravesend & Northfleet (loan)	5	(3)
2004–2005	Gravesend & Northfleet	45	(16)
2005	Kettering Town	3	(0)
2005–2008	Bishop's Stortford	149	(62)
2008–2010	Glenavon	?	(?)
2010–2011	St Neots Town	16	(5)
2011	Braintree Town	?	(?)
2011–2012	Bury Town	?	(?)
- * Club domestic league appearances and goals

Roy Kabina Essandoh (born 17 February 1976) is a Northern Irish former professional footballer.

He is best remembered for his last gasp FA Cup quarter final winner against Leicester City while with Wycombe Wanderers in which he came off the bench after famously only turning up because of a Ceefax advert.

== Early life ==
Born in Belfast, Essandoh moved with his family to Ghana (his father Richard's birthplace) when he was seven months old. When he was eight, the family moved back to Northern Ireland, where he attended school.

== Club career ==
Essandoh began his career at Motherwell when he was 18 years of age. Following a short spell at East Fife, he moved to Finland to play for VPS Vaasa until the turn of the new millennium when he returned to the United Kingdom.

Upon his return, and after just a couple of games for Conference National side Rushden & Diamonds, followed the highlight of his career when somewhat extraordinarily Essandoh's agent responded to an appeal by Wycombe Wanderers manager Lawrie Sanchez looking for a fit, non-cup-tied striker the week before their FA Cup quarter-final match with Leicester City, which had been posted on the club's website and spotted by a journalist who published the story on the BBC's television text service Ceefax. Offered a two-week contract, Essandoh came on as a late substitute at Leicester's Filbert Street ground and scored a last-minute winning header to secure third-tier Wycombe a first-ever FA Cup semi-final place, against Liverpool.

Essandoh's goal in the FA Cup quarter-final against Leicester City was voted the 76th best FA Cup moment ever in Andy Gray's FA Cup Madness. It was however the only goal he scored for Wycombe, and he was released at the end of his first season in English football.

Essandoh's FA Cup exploits earned him a trial at Carlisle United in the summer of 2001. Despite scoring in a pre-season friendly against Northwich Victoria, Essandoh failed to secure a permanent move.

Essandoh continued his football career in England, mostly for non-league clubs in the East and South East. At Barnet, he scored against Yeovil in the league and Bournemouth in the Football League Trophy. Essandoh returned to Bishop's Stortford for an extended spell starting in 2005, after which he returned to his birth country to play for Glenavon. In August 2010, Essandoh signed for St Neots Town, before signing for Braintree Town on 31 March 2011.
