= Michael Simpson (footballer) =

English footballer

Personal information
- Full name: Michael Simpson
- Date of birth: 28 February 1974 (age 52)
- Place of birth: Nottingham, England
- Height: 5 ft 9 in (1.75 m)
- Position: Midfielder

Youth career
- –1992: Notts County

Senior career*
Years	Team	Apps	(Gls)
1992–1997	Notts County	49	(3)
1996	→ Plymouth Argyle (loan)	12	(0)
1996–1997	→ Wycombe Wanderers (loan)	5	(1)
1997–2004	Wycombe Wanderers	285	(16)
2004–2007	Leyton Orient	105	(4)
2007–2010	Burton Albion	89	(5)
2010–2011	Eastwood Town	39	(2)
Total		585	(31)
- * Club domestic league appearances and goals

Michael Simpson (born 28 February 1974) is an English former professional footballer who played as a midfielder.

== Career ==
Born in Nottingham, Simpson began his career at one of his hometown clubs, Notts County. He made 43 starts for the Magpies, before moving to Wycombe Wanderers on loan in 1996. He then made his return to Notts county and made a further appearance before Plymouth Argyle came in for his services in the same season of 1996–97. He made 10 starts for Plymouth and a further 2 substitute appearances. In 1997, Simpson returned to Wycombe Wanderers, where he finally found home. In a highly successful seven years at Wycombe, he clocked up 251 starts and 15 as a substitute. Simpson played a big part in Wycombe's famous FA Cup run of the 2000–01 season, where they beat then Premiership Leicester City to reach the semi-finals.

Simpson's great Wycombe career was halted in 2004, where he was released after their relegation to League Two. He signed for Leyton Orient in the summer of 2004 on a free transfer. Since his arrival at Brisbane Road, he has chalked up 105 appearances and 3 goals.

In November 2007 after a lengthy injury, he linked up with Burton Albion and was an integral part of the squad which won promotion to The Football League in 2009.

Simpson was released at the end of the 2009–10 season, before joining Eastwood Town.

== Honours ==
Notts County

- Anglo-Italian Cup: 1994–95

Burton Albion

- Conference Premier: 2008–09
