= 1997–98 Leicester City F.C. season =

1997–98 season of Leicester City

Leicester City F.C.
1997–98 season
- Chairman: Tom Smeaton
- Manager: Martin O'Neill
- Stadium: Filbert Street
- FA Premier League: 10th
- FA Cup: Fourth round
- League Cup: Third round
- UEFA Cup: First round
- Player of the Year: Matt Elliott
- Top goalscorer: League: Emile Heskey (10); All: Heskey/Ian Marshall (10)
- Highest home attendance: 21,699 vs Newcastle United (29 April 1998, FA Premier League)
- Lowest home attendance: 18,553 vs Wimbledon (10 November 1997, FA Premier League)
- Average home league attendance: 20,615
Home colours	Away colours	Third colours

During the 1997–98 English football season, Leicester City competed in the FA Premier League.

== Season summary ==
Leicester City's return to European competition for the first time since the 1960s was short-lived, and they suffered a first-hurdle defeat at the hands of Spanish team Atlético Madrid. Their challenges in the domestic cups fared little better, and a 10th-place finish in the final table was not enough for another UEFA Cup adventure. But they managed to hold on to star players like Neil Lennon and Emile Heskey, and, most importantly, highly rated manager Martin O'Neill, giving fans hope of another challenge for honours in 1998–99.

1997-98 Leicester City team

== Final league table ==
Pos	Team	Pld	W	D	L	GF	GA	GD	Pts
8	West Ham United	38	16	8	14	56	57	−1	56
9	Derby County	38	16	7	15	52	49	+3	55
10	Leicester City	38	13	14	11	51	41	+10	53
11	Coventry City	38	12	16	10	46	44	+2	52
12	Southampton	38	14	6	18	50	55	−5	48

Source: Premier League
Rules for classification: 1) points; 2) goal difference; 3) number of goals scored.

Results summary

Overall								Home						Away					
Pld	W	D	L	GF	GA	GD	Pts	W	D	L	GF	GA	GD	W	D	L	GF	GA	GD
38	13	14	11	51	41	+10	53	6	10	3	21	15	+6	7	4	8	30	26	+4

Source: 1997-98 FA Premier League table

Results by round

Round	1	2	3	4	5	6	7	8	9	10	11	12	13	14	15	16	17	18	19	20	21	22	23	24	25	26	27	28	29	30	31	32	33	34	35	36	37	38
Ground	H	A	H	H	A	H	A	H	A	H	A	H	A	H	H	A	H	A	H	A	H	A	H	A	H	A	H	A	A	A	H	A	H	A	A	H	H	A
Result	W	W	D	D	L	W	W	D	W	L	L	W	D	L	D	W	D	L	L	L	D	D	D	W	W	D	W	L	L	L	D	W	D	D	W	D	W	L
Position	5	4	4	4	6	5	3	4	3	4	5	4	5	7	6	6	6	7	8	9	9	9	9	9	9	9	7	7	9	12	12	10	10	10	9	9	8	10

Source: 11v11.com: 1997-98 Leicester City results
A = Away; H = Home; W = Win; D = Draw; L = Loss

== Results ==
Win Draw Loss

=== Pre-season ===
16 July 1997	Penzance	1–7	Leicester City	Penzance
			Heskey (?); Whitlow (?); Fox (?); Skeldon (?); Robins (?); Izzet (?)	Stadium: Penlee Park

18 July 1997	Torpoint Athletic	1–3	Leicester City	Torpoint
			McMahon (?); Guppy (?); Heskey (?)	Stadium: The Mill

19 July 1997	Torquay United	3–1	Leicester City	Torquay
			Izzet (?)	Stadium: Plainmoor

21 July 1997	Grantham Town	0–5	Leicester City	Grantham
			Wilson (?); Skeldon (?)	Stadium: South Kesteven Sports Stadium

22 July 1997	Scunthorpe United	0–4	Leicester City	Scunthorpe
19:30 BST			Claridge (?); Marshall (?); Wilson (?); Robins (?)	Stadium: Glanford Park

23 July 1997	Notts County	1–2	Leicester City	Nottingham
	Cunnington (?)		Oparaku (?); Savage (?)	Stadium: Meadow Lane

28 July 1997	Olympiacos (Greece)	3–1	Leicester City	Athens
			Campbell (?)	Stadium: Olympic Stadium

1 August 1997	Preston North End	0–2	Leicester City	Preston
			McMahon (?); Marshall (?)	Stadium: Deepdale

3 August 1997	Northampton Town	1–2	Leicester City	Northampton
			Heskey (?); Campbell (?)	Stadium: Sixfields Stadium

5 August 1997	Peterborough United	2–2	Leicester City	Peterborough
19:45 BST	de Souza (?)		Robins (?); Campbell (?)	Stadium: London Road Stadium

=== FA Premier League ===
9 August 1997	Leicester City	1–0	Aston Villa	Leicester
15:00 BST	Marshall 37'			Stadium: Filbert Street; Attendance: 20,304; Referee: Stephen Lodge

13 August 1997	Liverpool	1–2	Leicester City	Liverpool
19:45 BST	Ince 85'		Elliott 1'; Fenton 83'	Stadium: Anfield; Attendance: 35,007; Referee: Jeff Winter

23 August 1997	Leicester City	0–0	Manchester United	Leicester
15:00 BST				Stadium: Filbert Street; Attendance: 21,221; Referee: Dermot Gallagher

27 August 1997	Leicester City	3–3	Arsenal	Leicester
19:45 BST	Heskey 84'; Elliott 90+2'; Walsh 90+5'		Bergkamp 9', 61', 90+3'	Stadium: Filbert Street; Attendance: 21,089; Referee: Graham Barber

30 August 1997	Sheffield Wednesday	1–0	Leicester City	Sheffield
15:00 BST	Carbone 56' (pen.)			Stadium: Hillsborough; Attendance: 24,851; Referee: Paul Alcock

13 September 1997	Leicester City	3–0	Tottenham Hotspur	Leicester
15:00 BST	Walsh 55'; Guppy 68'; Heskey 77'			Stadium: Filbert Street; Attendance: 20,683; Referee: Alan Wilkie

20 September 1997	Leeds United	0–1	Leicester City	Leeds
15:00 BST			Walsh 32'	Stadium: Elland Road; Attendance: 29,620; Referee: Keith Burge

24 September 1997	Leicester City	1–1	Blackburn Rovers	Leicester
19:45 BST	Izzet 43'		Sutton 36'	Stadium: Filbert Street; Attendance: 19,921; Referee: Neale Barry

27 September 1997	Barnsley	0–2	Leicester City	Barnsley
15:00 BST			Marshall 55'; Fenton 63'	Stadium: Oakwell; Attendance: 18,660; Referee: Graham Poll

6 October 1997	Leicester City	1–2	Derby County	Leicester
20:00 BST	Elliott 67'		Baiano 21', 62'	Stadium: Filbert Street; Attendance: 19,585; Referee: Gerald Ashby

18 October 1997	Chelsea	1–0	Leicester City	London
15:00 BST	Leboeuf 88'			Stadium: Stamford Bridge; Attendance: 33,356; Referee: Uriah Rennie

27 October 1997	Leicester City	2–1	West Ham United	Leicester
20:00 GMT	Heskey 16'; Marshall 82'		Berkovic 58'	Stadium: Filbert Street; Attendance: 20,201; Referee: Mike Reed

1 November 1997	Newcastle United	3–3	Leicester City	Newcastle
15:00 GMT	Barnes 4' (pen.); Tomasson 45'; Beresford 90'		Marshall 12', 32'; Elliott 54'; Heskey (red card) 90'	Stadium: St James' Park; Attendance: 36,754; Referee: Gary Willard

10 November 1997	Leicester City	0–1	Wimbledon	Leicester
20:00 GMT			Gayle 50'	Stadium: Filbert Street; Attendance: 18,553; Referee: Mike Riley

22 November 1997	Leicester City	0–0	Bolton Wanderers	Leicester
15:00 GMT				Stadium: Filbert Street; Attendance: 20,464; Referee: Graham Barber

29 November 1997	Coventry City	0–2	Leicester City	Coventry
15:00 GMT			Fenton 32'; Elliott 75' (pen.)	Stadium: Highfield Road; Attendance: 18,309; Referee: Martin Bodenham

6 December 1997	Leicester City	1–1	Crystal Palace	Leicester
15:00 GMT	Izzet 90'		Edworthy (red card) 29'; Padovano 43'	Stadium: Filbert Street; Attendance: 19,191; Referee: Uriah Rennie

13 December 1997	Southampton	2–1	Leicester City	Southampton
15:00 GMT	Le Tissier 2'; Benali 54'		Savage 84'	Stadium: The Dell; Attendance: 15,121; Referee: Stephen Lodge

20 December 1997	Leicester City	0–1	Everton	Leicester
15:00 GMT			Speed 89' (pen.)	Stadium: Filbert Street; Attendance: 20,628; Referee: Jeff Winter

26 December 1997	Arsenal	2–1	Leicester City	London
12:00 GMT	Platt 36'; Walsh 56' (o.g.)		Lennon 77'	Stadium: Highbury; Attendance: 38,023; Referee: David Elleray

28 December 1997	Leicester City	1–1	Sheffield Wednesday	Leicester
15:00 GMT	Guppy 28'		Stefanović (yellow card) (yellow-red card) 43'; Booth 85'	Stadium: Filbert Street; Attendance: 20,800; Referee: Graham Poll

10 January 1998	Aston Villa	1–1	Leicester City	Birmingham
15:00 GMT	Joachim 87'		Parker 53' (pen.)	Stadium: Villa Park; Attendance: 36,429; Referee: Mike Riley

17 January 1998	Leicester City	0–0	Liverpool	Leicester
15:00 GMT				Stadium: Filbert Street; Attendance: 21,633; Referee: Steve Dunn

31 January 1998	Manchester United	0–1	Leicester City	Manchester
15:00 GMT			Cottee 30'	Stadium: Old Trafford; Attendance: 55,156; Referee: Gerald Ashby

7 February 1998	Leicester City	1–0	Leeds United	Leicester
15:00 GMT	Parker 44' (pen.)			Stadium: Filbert Street; Attendance: 21,244; Referee: Neale Barry

14 February 1998	Tottenham Hotspur	1–1	Leicester City	London
15:00 GMT	Calderwood 51'		Cottee 34'	Stadium: White Hart Lane; Attendance: 28,355; Referee: Stephen Lodge

21 February 1998	Leicester City	2–0	Chelsea	Leicester
15:00 GMT	Heskey 3', 89'			Stadium: Filbert Street; Attendance: 21,335; Referee: Paul Durkin

28 February 1998	Blackburn Rovers	5–3	Leicester City	Blackburn
15:00 GMT	Dahlin 11'; Sutton 25', 45', 47'; Hendry 63'		Wilson 68'; Izzet 80'; Ullathorne 81'	Stadium: Ewood Park; Attendance: 24,854; Referee: Neale Barry

14 March 1998	Wimbledon	2–1	Leicester City	London
15:00 GMT	Roberts 14'; Hughes 62'		Savage 57'	Stadium: Selhurst Park; Attendance: 13,229; Referee: Mike Riley

28 March 1998	Bolton Wanderers	2–0	Leicester City	Bolton
15:00 GMT	Bergsson (red card) 26'; Thompson 52', 89'		Ullathorne (red card) 41'	Stadium: Reebok Stadium; Attendance: 25,000; Referee: Uriah Rennie

4 April 1998	Leicester City	1–1	Coventry City	Leicester
15:00 BST	Wilson 78'		Whelan 80'	Stadium: Filbert Street; Attendance: 21,137; Referee: Graham Barber

11 April 1998	Crystal Palace	0–3	Leicester City	London
15:00 BST			Heskey 45', 60'; Elliott 74'	Stadium: Selhurst Park; Attendance: 18,771; Referee: Alan Wilkie

14 April 1998	Leicester City	3–3	Southampton	Leicester
19:45 BST	Lennon 18'; Elliott 52'; Parker 90' (pen.)		Østenstad 17', 27'; Hirst 49'	Stadium: Filbert Street; Attendance: 20,708; Referee: Graham Poll

18 April 1998	Everton	1–1	Leicester City	Liverpool
15:00 BST	Madar 2'		Marshall 38'	Stadium: Goodison Park; Attendance: 33,642; Referee: Stephen Lodge

26 April 1998	Derby County	0–4	Leicester City	Derby
16:00 BST			Heskey 1', 8'; Izzet 2'; Marshall 15'	Stadium: Pride Park; Attendance: 29,855; Referee: Gary Willard

29 April 1998	Leicester City	0–0	Newcastle United	Leicester
19:45 BST				Stadium: Filbert Street; Attendance: 21,699; Referee: Martin Bodenham

2 May 1998	Leicester City	1–0	Barnsley	Leicester
15:00 BST	Zagorakis 57'			Stadium: Filbert Street; Attendance: 21,293; Referee: Dermot Gallagher

10 May 1998	West Ham United	4–3	Leicester City	London
16:00 BST	Lampard 15'; Abou 31', 74'; Sinclair 65'		Cottee 59', 83'; Heskey 66'	Stadium: Upton Park; Attendance: 25,781; Referee: Uriah Rennie

=== FA Cup ===
3 January 1998 R3	Leicester City	4–0	Northampton Town	Leicester
15:00 BST	Marshall 17'; Parker 26' (pen.); Savage 53'; Cottee 58'		Clarkson (red card) 69'	Stadium: Filbert Street; Attendance: 20,608; Referee: Alan Wilkie

24 January 1998 R4	Crystal Palace	3–0	Leicester City	London
15:00 BST	Dyer 33', 62', 66'			Stadium: Selhurst Park; Attendance: 15,489; Referee: Paul Alcock

=== League Cup ===
14 October 1997 R3	Grimsby Town	3–1	Leicester City	Cleethorpes
19:45 BST	Jobling 68'; Livingstone 72', 78'		Marshall 17'	Stadium: Blundell Park; Attendance: 7,738; Referee: Mike Riley

=== UEFA Cup ===
16 September 1997 R1 1st leg	Atlético Madrid (Spain)	2–1	Leicester City	Madrid
21:30	Juninho 70'; Vieri 72' (pen.)	Report	Marshall 11'	Stadium: Vicente Calderón Stadium; Attendance: 35,000; Referee: Roy Helge Olsen

30 September 1997 R1 2nd leg	Leicester City	0–2 (1–4 agg.)	Atlético Madrid (Spain)	Leicester
19:45 BST	Parker (yellow card) (yellow-red card) 59'	Report	López (red card) 50'; Juninho 72'; Kiko 88'	Stadium: Filbert Street; Attendance: 20,776; Referee: Rémi Harrel

== Squad ==
Note: Flags indicate national team as defined under FIFA eligibility rules; some limited exceptions apply. Players may hold more than one non-FIFA nationality.

No.	Pos.	Nation	Player
1	GK	USA	Kasey Keller
4	DF	ENG	Julian Watts
5	DF	ENG	Steve Walsh (captain)
6	MF	TUR	Muzzy Izzet
7	MF	NIR	Neil Lennon
8	MF	ENG	Scott Taylor
9	FW	ENG	Steve Claridge
10	MF	ENG	Garry Parker
11	FW	ENG	Emile Heskey
14	MF	WAL	Robbie Savage
15	DF	SWE	Pontus Kåmark
16	MF	SCO	Stuart Campbell
17	DF	ENG	Spencer Prior
18	DF	SCO	Matt Elliott (vice-captain)

No.	Pos.	Nation	Player
19	DF	ENG	Robert Ullathorne
20	FW	ENG	Ian Marshall
21	MF	ENG	Graham Fenton
22	GK	FRA	Pegguy Arphexad
23	MF	ENG	Sam McMahon
24	MF	ENG	Steve Guppy
25	MF	ENG	Stuart Wilson
26	FW	SWE	Lars-Gunnar Carlstrand
27	FW	ENG	Tony Cottee (Note: Issued number 8 in the UEFA Cup.)
29	MF	ENG	Stefan Oakes
30	GK	ENG	Ian Andrews (Note: Issued number 13 in the UEFA Cup.)
33	DF	ENG	Martin Fox
37	MF	GRE	Theodoros Zagorakis

=== Left club during season ===
Note: Flags indicate national team as defined under FIFA eligibility rules; some limited exceptions apply. Players may hold more than one non-FIFA nationality.

No.	Pos.	Nation	Player
3	DF	ENG	Mike Whitlow (to Bolton Wanderers)
9	FW	ENG	Steve Claridge (to Wolves)

No.	Pos.	Nation	Player
12	FW	ENG	Mark Robins (to CD Ourense)

=== Reserve squad ===
Note: Flags indicate national team as defined under FIFA eligibility rules; some limited exceptions apply. Players may hold more than one non-FIFA nationality.

No.	Pos.	Nation	Player
-	DF	ENG	Guy Branston
-	FW	ENG	Lawrie Dudfield

No.	Pos.	Nation	Player
-	DF	SCO	Gary Neil

== Club staff ==
Directors & Senior Management
Role	Person
President	(England) Ken Brigstock
Chairman	(England) Tom Smeaton
Vice Chairman	(England) John Elsom
Directors	(England) Roy Parker
Directors	(England) Martin George
Directors	(England) Terry Shipman
Directors	(England) John Sharp
Chief Executive	(England) Barrie Pierpoint
Deputy Chief Executive	(England) Charles Rayner

First Team Management & Youth Team Management
Role	Person
First Team Manager	(Northern Ireland) Martin O'Neill
First Team Assistant Manager	(Scotland) John Robertson
First Team Coach	(England) Steve Walford
Goalkeeping Team Coach	(Republic of Ireland) Jim McDonagh
Reserve Team Coach	(England) Paul Franklin
Physiotherapist	(England) Mick Yeoman
Physiotherapist	(England) Alan Smith
Youth Academy Manager	(England) David Nish
Head Coach of Youth Development	(England) Neville Hamilton
Youth Development Officer	(England) Steve Sims
Chief Scout	(Scotland) Jim Melrose
Kit Manager	(England) Paul McAndrew

Source: Leicester City F.C.

== Transfers ==
=== In ===
Date	Pos.	Name	From	Fee
23 July 1997	MF	(Wales) Robbie Savage	Crewe Alexandra	£400,000
8 August 1997	MF	(England) Graham Fenton	Blackburn Rovers	£1,100,000
14 August 1997	FW	(England) Tony Cottee	Selangor	£500,000
20 August 1997	GK	(France) Pegguy Arphexad	Lens	Free transfer
5 February 1998	MF	(Greece) Theodoros Zagorakis	PAOK	£750,000

=== Out ===
Date	Pos.	Name	To	Fee
17 June 1997	MF	(Jamaica) Jamie Lawrence	Bradford City	£50,000
22 June 1997	DF	(England) Neil Lewis	Peterborough United	£75,000
23 July 1997	DF	(England) Simon Grayson	Aston Villa	£1,350,000
2 August 1997	GK	(England) Kevin Poole	Birmingham City	Free transfer
19 September 1997	DF	(England) Mike Whitlow	Bolton Wanderers	£500,000
16 January 1998	FW	(England) Mark Robins	Ourense	Signed
26 March 1998	FW	(England) Steve Claridge	Wolverhampton Wanderers	£350,000

Transfers in: ▼£2,750,000
Transfers out: ▲£2,325,000
Total spending: ▼£525,000

== Statistics ==
=== Appearances, goals and cards ===
(Starting appearances + substitute appearances)

No.	Pos.	Name	League		FA Cup		League Cup		UEFA Cup		Total		Discipline	
No.	Pos.	Name	Apps	Goals	Apps	Goals	Apps	Goals	Apps	Goals	Apps	Goals	Yellow card	Red card
1	GK	(United States) Kasey Keller	32	0	2	0	1	0	2	0	37	0	2	0
4	DF	(England) Julian Watts	0+3	0	0	0	1	0	1	0	2+3	0	0	0
5	DF	(England) Steve Walsh	23+3	3	1	0	1	0	1	0	26+3	3	3	0
6	MF	(Turkey) Muzzy Izzet	36	4	2	0	0	0	2	0	40	4	6	0
7	MF	(Northern Ireland) Neil Lennon	37	2	2	0	1	0	2	0	42	2	8	0
9	FW	(England) Steve Claridge	10+7	0	0	0	0	0	0+1	0	10+8	0	0	0
10	MF	(England) Garry Parker	15+7	3	2	1	0	0	2	0	19+7	4	1	0
11	FW	(England) Emile Heskey	35	10	2	0	0	0	2	0	39	10	4	1
14	MF	(Wales) Robbie Savage	28+7	2	2	1	1	0	0+1	0	31+8	3	4	0
15	DF	(Sweden) Pontus Kåmark	35	0	2	0	0	0	2	0	39	0	2	0
16	MF	(Scotland) Stuart Campbell	6+5	0	0	0	1	0	0	0	7+5	0	1	0
17	DF	(England) Spencer Prior	28+2	0	1	0	0	0	2	0	31+2	0	2	0
18	DF	(Scotland) Matt Elliott	37	7	2	0	1	0	2	0	42	7	7	0
19	DF	(England) Robert Ullathorne	3+3	1	0	0	0	0	0	0	3+3	1	0	1
20	FW	(England) Ian Marshall	22+2	7	2	1	1	1	2	1	27+2	10	2	0
21	FW	(England) Graham Fenton	9+13	3	0+1	0	1	0	0+2	0	10+17	3	1	0
22	GK	(France) Pegguy Arphexad	6	0	0	0	0	0	0	0	6	0	0	0
23	MF	(England) Sam McMahon	0+1	0	0	0	0+1	0	0	0	0+2	0	0	0
24	MF	(England) Steve Guppy	37	2	2	0	1	0	2	0	42	2	4	0
25	MF	(England) Stuart Wilson	0+11	2	0+2	0	0+1	0	0	0	0+14	2	0	0
27	FW	(England) Tony Cottee	7+12	4	0+2	1	1	0	0+1	0	8+15	5	0	0
37	MF	(Greece) Theodoros Zagorakis	12+2	1	0	0	0	0	0	0	12+2	1	1	0
