= 1998–99 Leicester City F.C. season =

1998–99 season of Leicester City

Leicester City F.C.
1998–99 season
- Chairman: John Elsom
- Manager: Martin O'Neill
- Stadium: Filbert Street
- FA Premier League: 10th
- FA Cup: Fourth round
- League Cup: Runners up
- Player of the Year: Tony Cottee
- Top goalscorer: League: Cottee (10); All: Cottee (16)
- Highest home attendance: 22,091 vs Manchester United (16 January 1999, FA Premier League)
- Lowest home attendance: 13,480 vs Chesterfield (16 September 1998, League Cup)
- Average home league attendance: 20,469
Home colours	Away colours

During the 1998–99 English football season, Leicester City competed in the FA Premier League.

== Season summary ==
Leicester City repeated the previous season's 10th place in the FA Premier League, earning Martin O'Neill more credit for achieving strong finishes on a relatively limited budget. But the club's best chance of a UEFA Cup place was blown in late March when they lost to Tottenham Hotspur in the Worthington Cup final. At least City fans had the satisfaction of holding on to the highly rated O'Neill, who had seemed certain to desert the club for Leeds United early in the season.

== Kit ==
Leicester's season's kit was manufactured by Fox Leisure and their shirt was sponsored by the British food snack manufacturer Walkers Crisps.

== Final league table ==
Pos	Team	Pld	W	D	L	GF	GA	GD	Pts	Qualification or relegation
8	Derby County	38	13	13	12	40	45	−5	52	
9	Middlesbrough	38	12	15	11	48	54	−6	51	
10	Leicester City	38	12	13	13	40	46	−6	49	
11	Tottenham Hotspur	38	11	14	13	47	50	−3	47	Qualification for the UEFA Cup first round (Note: Tottenham Hotspur qualified for the UEFA Cup as League Cup winners.)
12	Sheffield Wednesday	38	13	7	18	41	42	−1	46	

Source: Premier League
Rules for classification: 1) points; 2) goal difference; 3) number of goals scored.
Notes:

Results summary

Overall								Home						Away					
Pld	W	D	L	GF	GA	GD	Pts	W	D	L	GF	GA	GD	W	D	L	GF	GA	GD
38	12	13	13	40	46	−6	49	7	6	6	25	25	0	5	7	7	15	21	−6

Source: 1998-99 FA Premier League table

Results by round

Round	1	2	3	4	5	6	7	8	9	10	11	12	13	14	15	16	17	18	19	20	21	22	23	24	25	26	27	28	29	30	31	32	33	34	35	36	37	38
Ground	A	H	A	H	H	A	H	A	H	A	H	A	A	H	A	H	H	A	A	H	A	H	A	H	A	H	A	H	A	H	H	A	A	H	A	H	H	A
Result	D	W	L	L	D	L	D	W	W	D	W	D	L	L	D	W	W	L	W	D	D	L	D	L	L	L	W	D	W	D	D	D	W	W	L	L	W	L
Position	4	2	8	13	14	17	17	16	11	11	7	6	9	12	13	12	8	11	10	10	10	12	12	13	14	14	14	13	13	14	13	13	12	11	11	11	10	10

Source: 11v11.com: 1998-99 Leicester City results
A = Away; H = Home; W = Win; D = Draw; L = Loss

== Results ==
Win Draw Loss

=== Pre-season ===
24 July 1998	Finn Harps	1–4	Leicester City	Ballybofey
			Heskey ?', ?'; Dykes o.g.' Fenton ?'	Stadium: Finn Park

26 July 1998	Galway United	1–6	Leicester City	Galway
			Fenton ?'; Heskey ?'; Oakes ?'; Cottee ?'; Lennon ?', ?' (pen.)	Stadium: Terryland Park

1 August 1998	Swindon Town	1–2	Leicester City	Swindon
	Walters 12'		Borrows 68' (o.g.); Wilson 86'	Stadium: County Ground; Attendance: 3,194

3 August 1998	Norwich City	0–1	Leicester City	Norwich
19:45 BST			Cottee ?'	Stadium: Carrow Road

8 August 1998	Rushden & Diamonds	0–1	Leicester City	Northampton
			Heskey ?'	Stadium: Nene Park

10 August 1998	Woking	0–2	Leicester City	Woking
19:45 BST			Fenton ?'; Otta ?'	Stadium: Kingfield Stadium

=== FA Premier League ===
15 August 1998 1	Manchester United	2–2	Leicester City	Manchester
15:00 BST	Sheringham 79'; Beckham 90'		Heskey 7'; Cottee 76'	Stadium: Old Trafford; Attendance: 55,052; Referee: Neale Barry

22 August 1998 2	Leicester City	2–0	Everton	Leicester
15:00 BST	Cottee 11'; Izzet 38'			Stadium: Filbert Street; Attendance: 21,037; Referee: Stephen Lodge

29 August 1998 3	Blackburn Rovers	1–0	Leicester City	Blackburn
15:00 BST	Gallacher 12'			Stadium: Ewood Park; Attendance: 22,544; Referee: Uriah Rennie

9 September 1998 4	Leicester City	0–1	Middlesbrough	Leicester
19:45 BST			Gascoigne 45'	Stadium: Filbert Street; Attendance: 20,635; Referee: Keith Burge

12 September 1998 5	Leicester City	1–1	Arsenal	Leicester
15:00 BST	Heskey 28'		Hughes 90'	Stadium: Filbert Street; Attendance: 21,628; Referee: Paul Durkin

19 September 1998 6	Derby County	2–0	Leicester City	Derby
15:00 BST	Schnoor 34'; Wanchope 51'			Stadium: Pride Park Stadium; Attendance: 26,738; Referee: Graham Poll

27 September 1998 7	Leicester City	1–1	Wimbledon	Leicester
16:00 BST	Elliott 86'		Earle 74'	Stadium: Filbert Street; Attendance: 17,725; Referee: Alan Wilkie

3 October 1998 8	Leeds United	0–1	Leicester City	Leeds
15:00 BST			Cottee 76'	Stadium: Elland Road; Attendance: 32,606; Referee: Graham Barber

19 October 1998 9	Leicester City	2–1	Tottenham Hotspur	Leicester
20:00 BST	Heskey 37'; Izzet 85'		Ferdinand 12'	Stadium: Filbert Street; Attendance: 20,787; Referee: Mike Riley

24 October 1998 10	Aston Villa	1–1	Leicester City	Birmingham
15:00 BST	Ehiogu 68'		Cottee 36'	Stadium: Villa Park; Attendance: 39,241; Referee: Keith Burge

31 October 1998 11	Leicester City	1–0	Liverpool	Leicester
15:00 GMT	Cottee 79'		McAteer (yellow card) (yellow-red card) 86'	Stadium: Filbert Street; Attendance: 21,837; Referee: Mike Reed

7 November 1998 12	Charlton Athletic	0–0	Leicester City	London
15:00 GMT				Stadium: The Valley; Attendance: 20,021; Referee: David Elleray

14 November 1998 13	West Ham United	3–2	Leicester City	London
15:00 GMT	Kitson 37'; Lomas 56'; Lampard 76'		Izzet 28'; Lampard 87' (o.g.)	Stadium: Upton Park; Attendance: 25,642; Referee: Stephen Lodge

21 November 1998 14	Leicester City	2–4	Chelsea	Leicester
15:00 GMT	Izzet 40'; Guppy 60'		Zola 28', 90'; Poyet 39'; Flo 56'	Stadium: Filbert Street; Attendance: 21,401; Referee: Paul Durkin

28 November 1998 15	Coventry City	1–1	Leicester City	Coventry
15:00 GMT	Huckerby 78'		Sinclair (yellow card) (yellow-red card) 47'; Heskey 89'	Stadium: Highfield Road; Attendance: 19,894; Referee: Mike Riley

5 December 1998 16	Leicester City	2–0	Southampton	Leicester
15:00 GMT	Heskey 61'; Walsh 63'			Stadium: Filbert Street; Attendance: 18,423; Referee: Dermot Gallagher

12 December 1998 17	Leicester City	3–1	Nottingham Forest	Leicester
15:00 GMT	Heskey 43'; Elliott 55' (pen.); Guppy 75'		van Hooijdonk 14' (red card) 58'	Stadium: Filbert Street; Attendance: 20,891; Referee: Mike Riley

19 December 1998 18	Newcastle United	1–0	Leicester City	Newcastle
15:00 GMT	Glass 66'			Stadium: St James' Park; Attendance: 36,718; Referee: Jeff Winter

26 December 1998 19	Sheffield Wednesday	0–1	Leicester City	Sheffield
15:00 GMT			Cottee 34'	Stadium: Hillsborough; Attendance: 33,513; Referee: Mike Reed

28 December 1998 20	Leicester City	1–1	Blackburn Rovers	Leicester
19:45 GMT	Walsh 44'		Gallacher 38'	Stadium: Filbert Street; Attendance: 21,083; Referee: Alan Wilkie

9 January 1999 21	Everton	0–0	Leicester City	Liverpool
15:00 GMT				Stadium: Goodison Park; Attendance: 32,792; Referee: Paul Durkin

16 January 1999 22	Leicester City	2–6	Manchester United	Leicester
15:00 GMT	Zagorakis 35'; Walsh 73'		Yorke 10', 63', 84'; Cole 49', 61'; Stam 90'	Stadium: Filbert Street; Attendance: 22,091; Referee: Steve Dunn

30 January 1999 23	Middlesbrough	0–0	Leicester City	Middlesbrough
15:00 GMT				Stadium: Riverside Stadium; Attendance: 34,631; Referee: Dermot Gallagher

6 February 1999 24	Leicester City	0–2	Sheffield Wednesday	Leicester
15:00 GMT			Jonk 48'; Carbone 78'	Stadium: Filbert Street; Attendance: 20,113; Referee: Gary Willard

20 February 1999 25	Arsenal	5–0	Leicester City	London
15:00 GMT	Anelka 23', 27', 44'; Parlour 42', 48'			Stadium: Highbury; Attendance: 38,069; Referee: Paul Durkin

1 March 1999 26	Leicester City	1–2	Leeds United	Leicester
20:00 GMT	Cottee 76'		Kewell 24'; Smith 60'	Stadium: Filbert Street; Attendance: 18,101; Referee: Graham Barber

6 March 1999 27	Wimbledon	0–1	Leicester City	London
15:00 GMT			Guppy 6'	Stadium: Selhurst Park; Attendance: 11,801; Referee: Rob Harris

13 March 1999 28	Leicester City	1–1	Charlton Athletic	Leicester
15:00 GMT	Lennon 60'		Jones (red card) 76'; Mendonca 90'	Stadium: Filbert Street; Attendance: 20,220; Referee: Alan Wilkie

3 April 1999 29	Tottenham Hotspur	0–2	Leicester City	London
15:00 BST			Elliott 43'; Cottee 67'	Stadium: White Hart Lane; Attendance: 35,415; Referee: Neale Barry

6 April 1999 30	Leicester City	2–2	Aston Villa	Leicester
19:45 BST	Savage 63'; Cottee 71'		Hendrie 2'; Joachim 49'	Stadium: Filbert Street; Attendance: 20,652; Referee: Stephen Lodge

10 April 1999 31	Leicester City	0–0	West Ham United	Leicester
15:00 GMT				Stadium: Filbert Street; Attendance: 20,402; Referee: Jeff Winter

18 April 1999 32	Chelsea	2–2	Leicester City	London
14:00 BST	Zola 30'; Elliott 69' (o.g.)		Duberry 82' (o.g.); Guppy 88'	Stadium: Stamford Bridge; Attendance: 34,535; Referee: Mike Reed

21 April 1999 33	Liverpool	0–1	Leicester City	Liverpool
19:45 BST			Marshall 90'	Stadium: Anfield; Attendance: 36,019; Referee: Graham Poll

24 April 1999 34	Leicester City	1–0	Coventry City	Leicester
15:00 BST	Marshall 45'			Stadium: Filbert Street; Attendance: 20,224; Referee: Graham Barber

1 May 1999 35	Southampton	2–1	Leicester City	Southampton
15:00 BST	Marsden 36'; Beattie 74'		Marshall 17'	Stadium: The Dell; Attendance: 15,228; Referee: Paul Alcock

5 May 1999 36	Leicester City	1–2	Derby County	Leicester
19:45 BST	Sinclair 28'		Sturridge 17'; Beck 60'	Stadium: Filbert Street; Attendance: 20,535; Referee: Neale Barry

8 May 1999 37	Leicester City	2–0	Newcastle United	Leicester
15:00 BST	Izzet 20'; Cottee 41'			Stadium: Filbert Street; Attendance: 21,125; Referee: Uriah Rennie

16 May 1999 38	Nottingham Forest	1–0	Leicester City	Nottingham
16:00 BST	Bart-Williams 76'			Stadium: City Ground; Attendance: 25,353; Referee: Steve Dunn

=== FA Cup ===
2 January 1999 R3	Leicester City	4–2	Birmingham City	Leicester
15:00 GMT	Sinclair 20'; Ullathorne 26'; Cottee 51'; Guppy 70'		Robinson 35'; Adebola 89'	Stadium: Filbert Street; Attendance: 19,846; Referee: Uriah Rennie

23 January 1999 R4	Leicester City	0–3	Coventry City	Leicester
15:00 GMT			Whelan 16'; Boateng (yellow card) (yellow-red card) 45'; Telfer 90'; Froggatt 90'	Stadium: Filbert Street; Attendance: 21,207; Referee: Alan Wilkie

=== League Cup ===
16 September 1998 R2 1st leg	Leicester City	3–0	Chesterfield	Leicester
19:45 BST	Heskey 41', 51'; Taggart 61'			Stadium: Filbert Street; Attendance: 13,480; Referee: Mike Riley

22 September 1998 R2 2nd leg	Chesterfield	1–3 (1–6 agg.)	Leicester City	Chesterfield
19:45 BST	Howard 28'		Heskey 57'; Fenton 87'; Wilson 90'	Stadium: Recreation Ground; Attendance: 4,565; Referee: Stephen Lodge

27 October 1998 R3	Charlton Athletic	1–2	Leicester City	London
19:45 GMT	Mortimer 56'		Cottee 51', 60'	Stadium: The Valley; Attendance: 19,671; Referee: Gary Willard

11 November 1998 R4	Leicester City	2–1	Leeds United	Leicester
19:45 GMT	Izzet 88'; Parker 90' (pen.)		Kewell 17'	Stadium: Filbert Street; Attendance: 20,161; Referee: Paul Durkin

2 December 1998 QF	Leicester City	1–0	Blackburn Rovers	Leicester
19:45 GMT	Lennon 67'			Stadium: Filbert Street; Attendance: 19,442; Referee: Alan Wilkie

26 January 1999 SF 1st leg	Sunderland	1–2	Leicester City	Sunderland
19:45 GMT	McCann 75'		Cottee 30', 62'	Stadium: Stadium of Light; Attendance: 38,332; Referee: Graham Barber

17 February 1999 SF 2nd leg	Leicester City	1–1 (3–2 agg.)	Sunderland	Leicester
19:45 GMT	Cottee 54'		Quinn 34'	Stadium: Filbert Street; Attendance: 21,231; Referee: David Elleray

21 March 1999 F	Leicester City	0–1	Tottenham Hotspur	London
15:00 GMT			Edinburgh (red card) 63'; Nielsen 90'	Stadium: Wembley Stadium; Attendance: 77,892; Referee: Terry Heilbron

== Squad ==
Note: Flags indicate national team as defined under FIFA eligibility rules; some limited exceptions apply. Players may hold more than one non-FIFA nationality.

No.	Pos.	Nation	Player
1	GK	USA	Kasey Keller
3	DF	JAM	Frank Sinclair
4	DF	NIR	Gerry Taggart
5	DF	ENG	Steve Walsh (captain)
6	MF	TUR	Muzzy Izzet
7	MF	NIR	Neil Lennon
8	MF	ENG	Scott Taylor
9	FW	ENG	Emile Heskey
10	MF	ENG	Garry Parker
11	MF	ENG	Steve Guppy
13	FW	ISL	Arnar Gunnlaugsson
14	MF	WAL	Robbie Savage
15	DF	SWE	Pontus Kåmark
16	MF	SCO	Stuart Campbell

No.	Pos.	Nation	Player
17	MF	SCO	Charlie Miller (on loan from Rangers)
18	DF	SCO	Matt Elliott
19	DF	ENG	Robert Ullathorne
20	FW	ENG	Ian Marshall
21	FW	ENG	Graham Fenton
22	GK	FRA	Pegguy Arphexad
24	MF	ENG	Andrew Impey
25	MF	ENG	Stuart Wilson
27	FW	ENG	Tony Cottee
28	DF	ENG	Steve Wenlock
29	MF	ENG	Stefan Oakes
30	GK	ENG	Ian Andrews
37	MF	GRE	Theodoros Zagorakis

=== Left club during season ===
Note: Flags indicate national team as defined under FIFA eligibility rules; some limited exceptions apply. Players may hold more than one non-FIFA nationality.

No. / Pos. / Nation / Player; 17 / DF / ENG / Spencer Prior (to Derby County)	No. / Pos. / Nation / Player; 23 / MF / ENG / Sam McMahon (to Cambridge United)

=== Reserve squad ===
Note: Flags indicate national team as defined under FIFA eligibility rules; some limited exceptions apply. Players may hold more than one non-FIFA nationality.

No.	Pos.	Nation	Player
-	GK	ENG	John Hodges
-	DF	ENG	Jon Ashton
-	DF	ENG	Guy Branston
-	DF	ENG	Paul Emerson
-	DF	ENG	Martin Fox

No.	Pos.	Nation	Player
-	DF	ENG	Tommy Goodwin
-	MF	ENG	Lee Allen
-	MF	NIR	Tim McCann
-	MF	SCO	Gary Neil
-	FW	ENG	Lawrie Dudfield

== Club staff ==
Directors & Senior Management
Role	Person
Chairman plc	(England) Rodney Walker
Chairman	(England) John Elsom
Deputy Chairman	(England) Philip Smith
Non Executive Director	(England) Roy Parker
Chief Executive	(England) Barrie Pierpoint
Finance Director	(England) Steve Kind

First Team & Youth Team Management
Role	Person
First Team Manager	(Northern Ireland) Martin O'Neill
First Team Assistant Manager	(Scotland) John Robertson
First Team Coach	(England) Steve Walford
Goalkeeping Coach	(Republic of Ireland) Jim McDonagh
Reserve Team Coach	(England) Paul Franklin
Physiotherapist	(England) Mick Yeoman
Physiotherapist	(England) Alan Smith
Youth Academy Manager	(England) David Nish
Youth Academy Assistant Manager	(England) Neville Hamilton
Youth Academy Assistant Manager	(England) Jon Rudkin
Youth Academy Physiotherapist	(England) Ian Andrews
Youth Development Officer	(England) Steve Sims
Chief Scout	(Scotland) Jim Melrose
Kit Manager	(England) Paul McAndrew

Source: Leicester City F.C.

== Statistics ==
=== Appearances, goals and cards ===
(Starting appearances + substitute appearances)

No.	Pos.	Name	League		FA Cup		League Cup		Total		Discipline	
No.	Pos.	Name	Apps	Goals	Apps	Goals	Apps	Goals	Apps	Goals	Yellow card	Red card
1	GK	(United States) Kasey Keller	36	0	2	0	7	0	45	0	2	0
3	DF	(Jamaica) Frank Sinclair	30+1	1	2	1	6	0	38+1	2	13	1
4	DF	(Northern Ireland) Gerry Taggart	9+6	0	1+1	0	5+1	1	15+8	1	3	0
5	DF	(England) Steve Walsh	17+5	3	1	0	5	0	23+5	3	2	0
6	MF	(Turkey) Muzzy Izzet	31	5	2	0	5	1	38	5	3	0
7	MF	(Northern Ireland) Neil Lennon	37	1	2	0	8	1	47	2	6	0
9	FW	(England) Emile Heskey	29+1	6	2	0	8	3	39+1	9	3	0
10	MF	(England) Garry Parker	2+5	0	0+2	0	3+1	1	5+8	1	0	0
11	MF	(England) Steve Guppy	38	4	2	1	8	0	48	5	4	0
13	FW	(Iceland) Arnar Gunnlaugsson	5+4	0	0	0	0	0	5+4	0	1	0
14	MF	(Wales) Robbie Savage	29+5	1	0	0	5+2	0	34+7	0	4	0
15	DF	(Sweden) Pontus Kåmark	15+4	0	0	0	1+1	0	16+5	0	0	0
16	MF	(Scotland) Stuart Campbell	1+11	0	1	0	1+1	0	3+12	0	1	0
17	MF	(Scotland) Charlie Miller	1+3	0	0	0	0	0	1+3	0	0	0
18	DF	(Scotland) Matt Elliott	37	3	2	0	8	0	47	3	9	0
19	DF	(England) Robert Ullathorne	25	0	2	1	7+1	0	34+1	1	4	0
20	FW	(England) Ian Marshall	6+4	3	0+1	0	0+1	0	6+6	3	0	0
21	FW	(England) Graham Fenton	3+6	0	0	0	1+1	1	4+7	1	0	0
22	GK	(France) Pegguy Arphexad	2+2	0	0	0	1	0	3+2	0	0	0
24	MF	(England) Andrew Impey	17+1	0	1	0	0	0	18+1	0	0	0
25	MF	(England) Stuart Wilson	1+8	0	0	0	1+4	1	2+12	1	0	0
27	FW	(England) Tony Cottee	29+2	10	1	1	5	5	35+2	16	2	0
29	MF	(England) Stefan Oakes	2+1	0	0	0	0	0	2+1	0	0	0
37	MF	(Greece) Theodoros Zagorakis	16+3	1	1+1	0	3+2	0	20+6	1	4	0

=== Assists ===
Rank	Pos.	No.	Player	FA Premier League	FA Cup	League Cup	Total
1	MF	11	(England) Steve Guppy	11	0	3	14
2	FW	9	(England) Emile Heskey	3	2	0	5
2	MF	7	(Northern Ireland) Neil Lennon	3	0	2	5
2	MF	6	(Turkey) Muzzy Izzet	2	0	3	5
2	MF	14	(Wales) Robbie Savage	2	0	3	5
4	DF	18	(Scotland) Matt Elliott	2	1	1	4
5	DF	4	(Northern Ireland) Gerry Taggart	2	0	0	2
5	MF	37	(Greece) Theodoros Zagorakis	2	0	0	2
6	MF	24	(England) Andrew Impey	1	0	0	1
6	DF	19	(England) Robert Ullathorne	1	0	0	1
6	DF	5	(England) Steve Walsh	1	0	0	1
6	FW	27	(England) Tony Cottee	0	1	0	1
6	DF	3	(Jamaica) Frank Sinclair	0	0	1	1
6	MF	10	(England) Garry Parker	0	0	1	1
6	MF	16	(Scotland) Stuart Campbell	0	0	1	1
Total				30	4	15	49

Source: Match reports in Competitions

== Transfers ==
=== In ===
Date	Pos.	Name	From	Fee
16 July 1998	DF	(Northern Ireland) Gerry Taggart	(England) Bolton Wanderers	Free transfer
13 August 1998	DF	(Jamaica) Frank Sinclair	(England) Chelsea	£2,000,000
24 November 1998	MF	(England) Andrew Impey	(England) West Ham United	£1,600,000
5 February 1999	FW	(Iceland) Arnar Gunnlaugsson	(England) Bolton Wanderers	£2,000,000

=== Out ===
Date	Pos.	Name	To	Fee
19 June 1998	DF	(England) Julian Watts	(England) Bristol City	Free transfer
3 July 1998	FW	(England) Graeme Jaffa	(Scotland) Dunfermline Athletic	Signed
21 August 1998	DF	(England) Spencer Prior	(England) Derby County	£700,000
1 February 1999	MF	(England) Sam McMahon	(England) Cambridge United	Free transfer

Transfers in: ▼£5,600,000
Transfers out: ▲£700,000
Total spending: ▼£4,900,000
