= Steve Guppy =

English footballer (born 1969)

Personal information
- Full name: Stephen Andrew Guppy
- Date of birth: 29 March 1969 (age 57)
- Place of birth: Winchester, Hampshire, England
- Height: 5 ft 11 in (1.80 m)
- Positions: Winger; wing-back

Youth career
- 1987–1989: Colden Common
- 1989: Southampton

Senior career*
Years	Team	Apps	(Gls)
1989–1994	Wycombe Wanderers	178	(26)
1994	Newcastle United	0	(0)
1994–1997	Port Vale	105	(12)
1997–2001	Leicester City	146	(9)
2001–2004	Celtic	33	(0)
2004	Leicester City	15	(0)
2004	Leeds United	3	(1)
2004	Stoke City	4	(0)
2004–2005	Wycombe Wanderers	14	(1)
2005–2006	D.C. United	5	(0)
2006–2007	Stevenage Borough	27	(1)
2008	Rochester Rhinos	22	(0)
Total		552	(50)

International career
1990	England under-21	1	(0)
1993	England semi-pro	1	(0)
1998	England B	1	(0)
1999	England	1	(0)
- * Club domestic league appearances and goals

Stephen Andrew Guppy (born 29 March 1969) is an English football coach and former professional footballer.

A winger, he started his senior career with Wycombe Wanderers in 1989; over five years, he made around 200 appearances for the club, helping Wycombe win promotion to the Football League. Earning a move to Newcastle United in 1994, later in the year, he transferred to Port Vale. After three successful years at Vale, he signed with Leicester City in 1997. After four years with the "Foxes", he moved to Scotland to play for Celtic. In 2004, he returned to Leicester before brief spells with Leeds United, Stoke City, and another return to Wycombe. In 2005, he joined American club D.C. United, and after another year returned to the English non-League scene with Stevenage Borough. He retired in 2008 following a spell in the States with Rochester Rhinos.

In addition to a successful 19-year club career, he earned England caps at under-21, semi-pro, 'B', and finally at full senior level.

== Playing career ==
=== Club career ===
Guppy was spotted playing for his local team, Colden Common and offered a chance with Southampton in March 1989. He made a handful of appearances in the Saints reserves at the end of the 1988–89 season (but failed to break into the first-team) before moving to Jim Kelman's Wycombe Wanderers in September 1989. He turned professional with Wycombe in 1992, at the age of 23. Before turning professional he worked on building sites.

At Wycombe, he first teamed up with newly appointed Martin O'Neill. He helped take them into the Football League as Conference champions in 1992–93 as well as completing the non-League double by winning the FA Trophy. He was a virtual ever-present in Wycombe's debut 1993–94 season in the Football League, at the end of which they secured promotion to Second Division via the play-offs.

In August 1994, he was signed by Kevin Keegan's Newcastle United for a fee of £150,000. He made one first-team appearance as a substitute in the League Cup in Newcastle's 2–0 defeat of Manchester United. He subsequently moved on to Port Vale in November 1994 for £225,000. He later recalled seeing a local newspaper headline "'Vale sign Premiership star' and I thought 'Great! Who else have they signed?' but of course the headline was about me. I thought – but I've only played a handful of games in the Premiership I'm hardly a star!" Vale was a step down, but another top manager – in the form of John Rudge, helped him focus on being a first-team performer again. Two days after signing for the club, on 26 November, Guppy made his debut in a 2–1 win over Millwall, where he collected assists for both goals. He played in the 1996 Anglo-Italian Cup final, as Vale lost 5–2 to Genoa. In nearly three seasons at the then First Division club, he became a fan favourite and a club legend after his memorable performances on the left wing.

In February 1997, he was tracked down by his former boss Martin O'Neill, who paid £850,000 to take him to Premier League club Leicester City for the first time. He was cup-tied for their victory in the 1997 League Cup final. He was the only Premier League player to play every minute of the 1998–99 season. Also, he completed the most crosses in the division. He gained League Cup honours with Leicester City in 2000, having also reached the final in the previous season. However, he was dropped by new manager Peter Taylor in the 2000–01 campaign.

In August 2001, Guppy re-joined O'Neill at Celtic for £700,000, where he spent two and a half years. During his time at Celtic, they won the Scottish Premier League in his first season at the club. The following season, 2002–03, Guppy had several injury problems, meaning he missed the 2003 UEFA Cup final. In 2003-04 Guppy only made one appearance for Celtic, in a Scottish League Cup tie against Partick Thistle, before leaving Celtic to re-join Leicester City in January 2004. However, he found that he did not suit manager Micky Adams's style of play. Guppy left Leicester in the summer of 2004 to try to get to the US to play. He then spent a brief spell at Leeds United in August 2004, scoring once against Nottingham Forest, before gaining a short-term deal at Stoke City, where former Vale manager John Rudge was director of football. This was followed by a short spell back at Wycombe, scoring once against Swansea City. He moved to the United States but his short stint in Major League Soccer with Washington-based D.C. United was ended prematurely due to injury. The club released him after playing in just five league games, during which he was featured in a starting line-up alongside Freddy Adu in midfield.

In August 2006 he signed for Stevenage Borough, scoring his first goal for them in a 1–1 draw at Exeter City. With Jeff Kenna, Guppy became the first player to play at both the new Wembley and the old Wembley. This was achieved on 12 May 2007 when Kidderminster Harriers played Borough in the 2007 final of the FA Trophy at the new Wembley Stadium. Borough won 3–2 despite being 2–0 down at half-time; Craig Dobson, who replaced Guppy on 63 minutes, scored the equalizing goal. Due to Stevenage winning, Guppy became the first ever person to win medals at both the old and new Wembley Stadium.

In 2008, he headed for America again, signing with the Rochester Rhinos as Player and Assistant Coach. Guppy logged 1,520 minutes of playing time in 21 league matches, starting in most of his appearances. He tallied two assists from his trademark crosses from the left wing. Guppy's first goal for the Rhinos came off of a header on 26 September in the final 10 minutes of the first round, first-leg play-off tie against the Charleston Battery.

=== International career ===
It was whilst at Leicester that he gained his only England cap, playing against Belgium on 10 October 1999. Manager Kevin Keegan described him as "a little bit like a left-sided David Beckham". Guppy remains the only footballer to have played for England under-21, England semi-pro, England B and the full England teams.

=== Style of play ===
Port Vale player and lifelong fan Tom Pope described Guppy as "a very tricky winger, one who could go on the inside or the outside" and a player with good crossing ability. In May 2019, he was voted into the "Ultimate Port Vale XI" by members of the OneValeFan supporter website.

== Coaching career ==
After a season as a player-coach at Rochester, Guppy was recruited for the position of assistant coach to Gary Smith at Major League Soccer team Colorado Rapids. Having had one more year of his coaching contract with the Rochester Rhinos, Rochester released Guppy from his duties, allowing him to move on to a higher level of coaching. He was assistant coach at the Colorado Rapids for three years, from 2009 to 2012. During his time at the club, the Rapids lifted the MLS Cup in 2010. He left the club when the Rapids parted company with Gary Smith in November 2011. In March 2012, Guppy reunited with his old boss Martin O'Neill at Sunderland to work as a part-time coach, giving extra specialised sessions on technical work to "Black Cats" young players. A few months later he settled into the role on a full-time basis.

In April 2013, Guppy followed O'Neill out of Sunderland as incoming manager Paolo Di Canio appointed his own coaching staff. In 2014, he joined O'Neill's coaching staff to specifically coach the wingers and strikers of the Republic of Ireland national side. He helped former teammate Neil Aspin to coach Port Vale during 2018–19 pre-season. O'Neill was sacked by Ireland in November 2018 following relegation out of the UEFA Nations League B Group 3, and Guppy also lost his position. He went on to be reunited with Gary Smith at Nashville SC, where he worked as an assistant coach. Smith and Guppy were fired in May 2024.

== Club statistics ==
=== Club ===
Appearances and goals by club, season and competition
Club	Season	League			National cup (Note: Includes FA Cup, Scottish Cup)		Other		Total	
Club	Season	Division	Apps	Goals	Apps	Goals	Apps	Goals	Apps	Goals
Wycombe Wanderers	1989–90	Conference	30	4					30	4
Wycombe Wanderers	1990–91	Conference	30	1					30	1
Wycombe Wanderers	1991–92	Conference	39	7					39	7
Wycombe Wanderers	1992–93	Conference	38	6					38	6
Wycombe Wanderers	1993–94	Third Division	41	8	3	0	14	2	58	10
Wycombe Wanderers	Total		178	26	3	0	14	2	195	28
Newcastle United	1994–95	Premier League	0	0	0	0	1	0	1	0
Port Vale	1994–95	First Division	27	2	1	0	0	0	28	2
Port Vale	1995–96	First Division	44	4	6	0	10	1	60	5
Port Vale	1996–97	First Division	34	6	1	0	5	0	40	6
Port Vale	Total		105	12	8	0	15	1	128	13
Leicester City	1996–97	Premier League	13	0	0	0	0	0	13	0
Leicester City	1997–98	Premier League	37	2	2	0	3	0	42	2
Leicester City	1998–99	Premier League	38	4	2	1	8	0	48	5
Leicester City	1999–2000	Premier League	30	2	2	0	5	0	37	2
Leicester City	2000–01	Premier League	28	1	3	0	3	0	34	1
Leicester City	Total		146	9	9	1	19	0	174	10
Celtic	2001–02	Scottish Premier League	16	0	2	0	5	0	23	0
Celtic	2002–03	Scottish Premier League	17	0	2	0	6	0	25	0
Celtic	2003–04	Scottish Premier League	0	0	0	0	1	0	1	0
Celtic	Total		33	0	4	0	12	0	49	0
Leicester City	2003–04	Premier League	15	0	0	0	0	0	15	0
Leeds United	2004–05	Championship	3	1	0	0	1	0	4	1
Stoke City	2004–05	Championship	4	0	0	0	0	0	4	0
Wycombe Wanderers	2004–05	League Two	14	1	1	0	1	0	16	1
D.C. United	2005	Major League Soccer	5	0					5	0
Stevenage Borough	2006–07	Conference National	27	1					27	1
Rochester Rhinos	2008	USL First Division	22	0					22	0
Career total			552	50	25	1	63	3	640	54

=== International ===
National team	Year	Apps	Goals
England	1999	1	0
Total		1	0

== Honours ==
Wycombe Wanderers

- Football League Third Division play-offs: 1994
- Football Conference: 1992–93
- FA Trophy: 1990–91, 1992–93

Port Vale

- Anglo-Italian Cup runner-up: 1995–96

Leicester City

- Football League Cup: 1999–2000; runner-up: 1998–99

Celtic

- Scottish Premier League: 2001–02
- Scottish Cup runner-up: 2001–02

Stevenage Borough

- FA Trophy: 2006–07

Individual

- PFA Team of the Year: 1993–94 Third Division
