= 1999–2000 Football League Cup =

League Cup, Worthington Cup

Tournament details
- Country: England; Wales
- Teams: 92

Final positions
- Champions: Leicester City (3rd title)
- Runners-up: Tranmere Rovers

Tournament statistics
- Top goal scorer(s): David Kelly (8 goals)

The 1999–2000 Football League Cup (known as the Worthington Cup for sponsorship reasons) was the 40th staging of the Football League Cup, a knockout competition for England's top 92 football clubs.

The competition began on 10 August 1999, and ended with the final on 27 February 2000, the last final to be held at the old Wembley Stadium. For the first time in English football history, the entire draw for each round was made after the first round. This meant each team could plot their route to the final as well as predicting future opponents.

The tournament was won by Leicester City, who beat Tranmere Rovers 2–1 in the final, thanks to two goals from Matt Elliott, sandwiched by an equaliser from David Kelly.

== First round ==
The 70 First, Second and Third Division clubs (with the exception of Blackburn Rovers and Charlton Athletic, who were relegated from the Premiership last season) compete from the first round. Each section is divided equally into a pot of seeded clubs and a pot of unseeded clubs. Clubs' rankings depend upon their finishing position in the 1998–99 season.

| Tie no | Home team^{1} | (1st Leg) (2nd Leg) Aggregate | Away team |
|---|---|---|---|
| 1 | Torquay United | (0–0) (0–3); 0–3 | Portsmouth |
| 2 | Brentford | (0–2) (0–2); 0–4 | Ipswich Town |
| 3 | Brighton | (0–2) (0–2); 0–4 | Gillingham |
| 4 | Manchester City | (5–0) (1–0); 6–0 | Burnley |
| 5 | Nottingham Forest | (3–0) (0–1); 3–1 | Mansfield Town |
| 6 | Reading | (0–0) (2–1); 2–1 | Peterborough United |
| 7 | Swansea City | (2–0) (1–1); 3–1 | Millwall |
| 8 | Birmingham City | (3–0) (2–1); 5–1 | Exeter City |
| 9 | Blackpool | (2–1) (1–3); 3–4 | Tranmere Rovers |
| 10 | Bournemouth | (2–0) (2–3); 4–3 | Barnet |
| 11 | Bury | (1–0) (0–2); 1–2 | Notts County |
| 12 | Cambridge United | (2–2) (1–2); 3–4 | Bristol City |
| 13 | Cardiff City | (1–2) (2–1); 3–3 | Q.P.R. |
After extra time – Cardiff City win 3 – 2 on penalties
| 14 | Carlisle United | (0–0) (0–6); 0–6 | Grimsby Town |
| 15 | Chester City | (2–1) (4–4); 6–5 | Port Vale |
| 16 | Colchester United | (2–2) (1–3); 3–5 | Crystal Palace |
| 17 | Darlington | (1–1) (3–5); 4–6 | Bolton Wanderers |
| 18 | Halifax Town | (0–0) (1–5); 1–5 | West Bromwich Albion |
| 19 | Hartlepool United | (3–3) (0–1); 3–4 | Crewe Alexandra |
| 20 | Lincoln City | (2–4) (2–2); 4–6 | Barnsley |
| 21 | Luton Town | (0–2) (2–2); 2–4 | Bristol Rovers |
| 22 | Macclesfield Town | (1–1) (0–3); 1–4 | Stoke City |
| 23 | Northampton Town | (1–2) (1–3); 2–5 | Fulham |
| 24 | Norwich City | (2–0) (1–2); 3–2 | Cheltenham Town |
| 25 | Preston | (1–0) (2–0); 3–0 | Wrexham |
| 26 | Rochdale | (1–2) (1–2); 2–4 | Chesterfield |
| 27 | Rotherham United | (0–1) (0–2); 0–3 | Hull City |
| 28 | Scunthorpe United | (0–2) (0–0); 0–2 | Huddersfield Town |
| 29 | Sheffield United | (3–0) (3–0); 6–0 | Shrewsbury Town |
| 30 | Southend United | (0–2) (0–1); 0–3 | Oxford United |
| 31 | Stockport County | (2–0) (1–1); 3–1 | Oldham Athletic |
| 32 | Swindon Town | (0–1) (1–1); 1–2 | Leyton Orient |
| 33 | Walsall | (4–1) (4–1); 8–2 | Plymouth Argyle |
| 34 | Wycombe Wanderers | (0–1) (4–2); 4–3 | Wolverhampton Wanderers |
| 35 | York City | (0–1) (1–2); 1–3 | Wigan Athletic |

^{1} Team at home in the 1st leg is denoted as the home team

== Second round ==
The 35 winners from the first round joined the 13 Premier League clubs not participating in European competition, along with Blackburn Rovers And Charlton Athletic in round two. First leg matches were played on 14 and 15 September, second leg matches were played on 21 and 22 September.

| Tie no | Home team^{1} | (1st Leg) (2nd Leg) Aggregate | Away team |
|---|---|---|---|
| 1 | Manchester City | (0–0) (3–4); 3–4 | Southampton |
| 2 | Nottingham Forest | (2–1) (0–0); 2–1 | Bristol City |
| 3 | Barnsley | (1–1) (3–3); 4–4 | Stockport County |
Barnsley win on away goals
| 4 | Birmingham City | (2–0) (1–0); 3–0 | Bristol Rovers |
| 5 | Bradford City | (1–1) (2–2); 3–3 | Reading |
Bradford City win on away goals
| 6 | Crystal Palace | (3–3) (2–4); 5–7 | Leicester City |
| 7 | Cardiff City | (1–1) (1–3); 2–4 | Wimbledon |
| 8 | Charlton Athletic | (0–0) (0–0); 0–0 | Bournemouth |
After extra time – Bournemouth win 3 – 1 on penalties
| 9 | Chester City | (0–1) (0–5); 0–6 | Aston Villa |
| 10 | Chesterfield | (0–0) (1–2); 1–2 | Middlesbrough |
| 11 | Crewe Alexandra | (2–1) (1–1); 3–2 | Ipswich Town |
| 12 | Gillingham | (1–4) (0–2); 1–6 | Bolton Wanderers |
| 13 | Grimsby Town | (4–1) (0–1); 4–2 | Leyton Orient |
| 14 | Huddersfield Town | (2–1) (2–2); 4–3 | Notts County |
| 15 | Hull City | (1–5) (2–4); 3–9 | Liverpool |
| 16 | Norwich City | (0–4) (0–2); 0–6 | Fulham |
| 17 | Oxford United | (1–1) (1–0); 2–1 | Everton |
| 18 | Portsmouth | (0–3) (1–3); 1–6 | Blackburn Rovers |
| 19 | Sheffield United | (2–0) (0–3); 2–3 | Preston |
| 20 | Stoke City | (0–0) (1–3); 1–3 | Sheffield Wednesday |
| 21 | Sunderland | (3–2) (5–0); 8–2 | Walsall |
| 22 | Swansea City | (0–0) (1–3); 1–3 | Derby County |
| 23 | Tranmere Rovers | (5–1) (1–3); 6–4 | Coventry City |
| 24 | Watford | (2–0) (1–3); 3–3 | Wigan Athletic |
Watford win on away goals
| 25 | West Bromwich Albion | (1–1) (4–3); 5–4 | Wycombe Wanderers |

^{1} Team at home in the 1st leg is denoted as the home team

== Third round ==
The 25 winners from the second round joined the seven Premiership clubs participating in European competition in round three. Matches were played on 12 and 13 October.

| Tie no | Home team | Score | Away team | Date |
|---|---|---|---|---|
| 1 | Aston Villa | 3–0 | Manchester United | 13 October 1999 |
| 2 | Chelsea | 0–1 | Huddersfield Town | 13 October 1999 |
| 3 | Derby County | 1–2 | Bolton Wanderers | 13 October 1999 |
| 4 | Leeds United | 1–0 | Blackburn Rovers | 13 October 1999 |
| 5 | Leicester City | 2–0 | Grimsby Town | 13 October 1999 |
| 6 | Middlesbrough | 1–0 | Watford | 13 October 1999 |
| 7 | Sheffield Wednesday | 4–1 | Nottingham Forest | 13 October 1999 |
| 8 | Southampton | 2–1 | Liverpool | 13 October 1999 |
| 9 | Tottenham Hotspur | 3–1 | Crewe Alexandra | 13 October 1999 |
| 10 | West Ham United | 2–0 | Bournemouth | 13 October 1999 |
| 11 | Arsenal | 2–1 | Preston | 12 October 1999 |
| 12 | Bradford City | 2–3 | Barnsley | 12 October 1999 |
| 13 | Wimbledon | 3–2 | Sunderland | 12 October 1999 |
| 14 | Birmingham City | 2–0 | Newcastle United | 12 October 1999 |
| 15 | Tranmere Rovers | 2–0 | Oxford United | 12 October 1999 |
| 16 | West Bromwich Albion | 1–2 | Fulham | 12 October 1999 |

== Fourth round ==
Most matches were played on 30 November 1 December with one played on 15 December.

30 November 1999
19:45

| Birmingham City | 2–3 | West Ham United |
|---|---|---|
| Hyde 8'; Grainger 44' | | Lomas 21'; Kitson 87'; Cole 89' |

St Andrews, Birmingham
Attendance: 17,728
Referee: Graham Poll
30 November 1999
20:00

| Bolton Wanderers | 1–0 | Sheffield Wednesday |
|---|---|---|
| Elliott 53' |

Reebok Stadium, Bolton
Attendance: 12,543
Referee: Kevin Lynch
30 November 1999
19:45

| Huddersfield Town | 1–2 (a.e.t.) | Wimbledon |
|---|---|---|
| Sellars 40' | | Kimble 60'; Euell 101' |

McAlpine Stadium, Huddersfield
Attendance: 13,312
Referee: Jeff Winter
30 November 1999
19:45

| Middlesbrough | 2–2 (a.e.t.) | Arsenal |
|---|---|---|
| Ricard 8', 83' (pen.) | | Henry 38'; Šuker 80' |
Penalties
| Ricard (penalty scored); Ziege (penalty scored); Gascoigne (penalty scored) | 3–1 | (penalty scored) Šuker; (penalty missed) Vivas; (penalty missed) Upson; (penalty missed) Sylvinho |

Riverside Stadium, Middlesbrough
Attendance: 23,157
Referee: Mike Riley
30 November 1999
19:45

| Tranmere Rovers | 4–0 | Barnsley |
|---|---|---|
| Parkinson 3'; Morgan 45'; Hill 56'; Black 86' |

Prenton Park, Tranmere
Attendance: 7,039
1 December 1999
19:45

| Aston Villa | 4–0 | Southampton |
|---|---|---|
| Watson 22'; Joachim 66'; Dublin 72', 90' |

Villa Park, Birmingham
Attendance: 17,608
Referee: Barry Knight
1 December 1999
19:45

| Fulham | 3–1 | Tottenham Hotspur |
|---|---|---|
| Hayles 10'; Collins 44'; Horsfield 77' | | Iversen 43' |

Craven Cottage, London
Attendance: 18,134
Referee: Dermot Gallagher
15 December 1999
19:45

| Leicester City | 0–0 (a.e.t.) | Leeds United |
Penalties
| Gunnlaugsson (penalty scored); Elliott (penalty scored); Impey (penalty scored); Zagorakis (penalty missed); Izzet (penalty scored) | 4–2 | (penalty scored) Woodgate; (penalty scored) Harte; (penalty missed) Kelly; (penalty missed) Bowyer |

Filbert Street, Leicester
Attendance: 16,125
Referee: Graham Barber

== Quarter-finals ==
The four matches were played between 14 December and 12 January.

11 January 2000
19:45

| West Ham United | 1–3 (a.e.t.) | Aston Villa |
|---|---|---|
| Lampard 47' | | Taylor 80', 118'; Joachim 93' |

Boleyn Ground, London
Attendance: 25,592
Referee: Jeff Winter

NOTE: This match was a replay after West Ham were ordered to replay the match after fielding an ineligible player in the original tie. West Ham had won the original tie on penalties.

12 January 2000
19:45

| Leicester City | 3–3 (a.e.t.) | Fulham |
|---|---|---|
| Marshall 85', 111'; Walsh 87' | Report | Peschisolido 58'; Horsfield 75'; Coleman 92' |
Penalties
| Gunnlaugsson (penalty scored); Savage (penalty scored); Fenton (penalty scored) | 3–0 | (penalty missed) Coleman; (penalty missed) Trollope; (penalty missed) Horsfield |

Filbert Street, Leicester
Attendance: 13,567
Referee: Mike Reed
14 December 1999
20:00

| Bolton Wanderers | 2–1 | Wimbledon |
|---|---|---|
| Guðjohnsen 34'; Johansen 39' (pen.) | Report | Cort 17' |

Reebok Stadium, Bolton
Attendance: 9,463
Referee: Alan Wilkie
14 December 1999
19:45

| Tranmere Rovers | 2–1 | Middlesbrough |
|---|---|---|
| Kelly 37'; Parkinson 71' | Report | Ziege 79' |

Prenton Park, Tranmere
Attendance: 10,581
Referee: David Elleray

== Semi-finals ==
The semi-final draw was made in December 1999 after the conclusion of the quarter finals. Unlike the other rounds, the semi-final ties were played over two legs, with each team playing one leg at home. The first leg matches were played on 12 and 25 January 2000, the second leg matches were played on 26 January and 2 February 2000. Tranmere Rovers reached the first major cup final of their history with a fine win over Bolton Wanderers, while Leicester City's victory over Aston Villa gave them their third appearance in the competition's final in four years.

=== First leg ===
12 January 2000
20:00

| Bolton Wanderers | 0–1 | Tranmere Rovers |
|---|---|---|
| | Report | Hill 22' |

Reebok Stadium, Bolton
Attendance: 13,303
Referee: Graham Barber
25 January 2000
19:45

| Aston Villa | 0–0 | Leicester City |
|---|---|---|
| | Report |

Villa Park, Birmingham
Attendance: 28,037
Referee: Terry Heilbron

=== Second leg ===
26 January 2000
20:00

| Tranmere Rovers | 3–0 | Bolton Wanderers |
|---|---|---|
| Henry 5'; Mahon 20' (pen.); Kelly 70' | Report |

Prenton Park, Tranmere
Attendance: 15,834
Referee: Graham Poll

Tranmere Rovers won 4–0 on aggregate

2 February 2000
19:45

| Leicester City | 1–0 | Aston Villa |
|---|---|---|
| Elliott 45' | Report |

Filbert Street, Leicester
Attendance: 21,843
Referee: Paul Durkin

Leicester City won 1–0 on aggregate

== Final ==
The 2000 Worthington Cup Final was played on 27 February 2000 and was contested between Leicester City and Tranmere Rovers at Wembley Stadium. Leicester won the game 2–1.

27 February 2000
15:00

| Leicester City | 2–1 | Tranmere Rovers |
|---|---|---|
| Elliott 29', 81' | Report | Kelly 77' |

Wembley Stadium, London
Attendance: 74,313
Referee: Alan Wilkie
