= List of Greece international footballers =

This is a list of Greece international footballers – football players who have played for the Greece national football team. All players with 50 or more official caps are listed here.

This table takes into account all Greece matches played up to and including 16 November 2026. Members of the Euro 2004-winning side are indicated by an asterisk (*). Those currently available for selection are denoted in bold.

| # | Name | Career | Caps | Goals |
|---|---|---|---|---|
| 1 | Giorgos Karagounis* | 1999–2014 | 139 | 10 |
| 2 | Theodoros Zagorakis* | 1994–2007 | 120 | 3 |
| 3 | Kostas Katsouranis* | 2003–2015 | 116 | 10 |
| 4 | Vasilis Torosidis | 2007–2019 | 101 | 10 |
| 5 | Angelos Basinas* | 1999–2009 | 100 | 7 |
| 6 | Stratos Apostolakis | 1986–1998 | 96 | 5 |
| 7 | Sokratis Papastathopoulos | 2008–2019 | 90 | 3 |
| 8 | Antonis Nikopolidis* | 1999–2008 | 90 | 0 |
| 9 | Angelos Charisteas* | 2001–2011 | 88 | 25 |
| 10 | **Anastasios Bakasetas** | 2016– | 84 | 19 |
| 11 | Dimitris Salpingidis | 2005–2014 | 82 | 13 |
| 12 | Georgios Samaras | 2006–2014 | 81 | 9 |
| 13 | Theofanis Gekas | 2005–2014 | 78 | 24 |
| 14 | Dimitris Saravakos | 1982–1994 | 78 | 22 |
| 15 | Stelios Giannakopoulos* | 1997–2008 | 77 | 12 |
| 16 | Tasos Mitropoulos | 1978–1994 | 77 | 8 |
| 17 | Panagiotis Tsalouchidis | 1987–1995 | 76 | 16 |
| 18 | Nikos Liberopoulos | 1996–2012 | 76 | 13 |
| 19 | Alexandros Tziolis | 2006–2018 | 75 | 2 |
| 20 | Nikos Anastopoulos | 1977–1988 | 74 | 29 |
| 21 | Giourkas Seitaridis* | 2002–2010 | 72 | 1 |
| 22 | Giannis Kalitzakis | 1987–1999 | 71 | 0 |
| 23 | Stelios Manolas | 1982–1995 | 71 | 6 |
| 24 | **Petros Mantalos** | 2014–2025 | 71 | 7 |
| 25 | Vasilios Tsiartas* | 1994–2005 | 70 | 12 |
| 26 | Nikos Dabizas* | 1994-2004 | 70 | 0 |
| 27 | Zisis Vryzas* | 1994–2005 | 68 | 9 |
| 28 | Savvas Kofidis | 1982–1994 | 67 | 1 |
| 29 | Kostas Mitroglou | 2009–2019 | 65 | 17 |
| 30 | **Georgios Masouras** | 2018– | 65 | 13 |
| 31 | **Vangelis Pavlidis** | 2019– | 63 | 10 |
| 32 | Georgios Georgiadis* | 1993–2004 | 61 | 11 |
| 33 | Nikos Machlas | 1993–2002 | 61 | 18 |
| 34 | Mimis Papaioannou | 1963–1978 | 61 | 21 |
| 35 | Sotiris Kyrgiakos | 2002–2010 | 61 | 4 |
| 36 | Takis Fyssas* | 1999–2007 | 60 | 4 |
| 37 | Nikos Sarganis | 1980–1991 | 58 | 0 |
| 38 | **Dimitrios Kourbelis** | 2017– | 58 | 4 |
| 39 | Loukas Vyntra | 2005–2015 | 57 | 0 |
| 40 | **Kostas Tsimikas** | 2018– | 57 | 2 |
| 41 | **Kostas Fortounis** | 2012–2023 | 56 | 9 |
| 42 | Demis Nikolaidis* | 1995–2004 | 54 | 17 |
| 43 | Traianos Dellas* | 2001–2009 | 53 | 1 |
| 44 | **Odysseas Vlachodimos** | 2018– | 53 | 0 |
| 45 | Georgios Firos | 1974–1982 | 52 | 0 |
| 46 | Kostas Iosifidis | 1974–1982 | 51 | 2 |
| 47 | Petros Michos | 1982–1988 | 51 | 0 |
| 48 | Mimis Domazos | 1959–1980 | 50 | 4 |
| 49 | Marinos Ouzounidis | 1992–2001 | 50 | 4 |
| 50 | Giannis Maniatis | 2010–2017 | 50 | 1 |
| 51 | Georgios Tzavellas | 2010–2023 | 50 | 3 |
