= Theodoros Zagorakis =

Greek politician and former footballer

- Θεόδωρος Ζαγοράκης
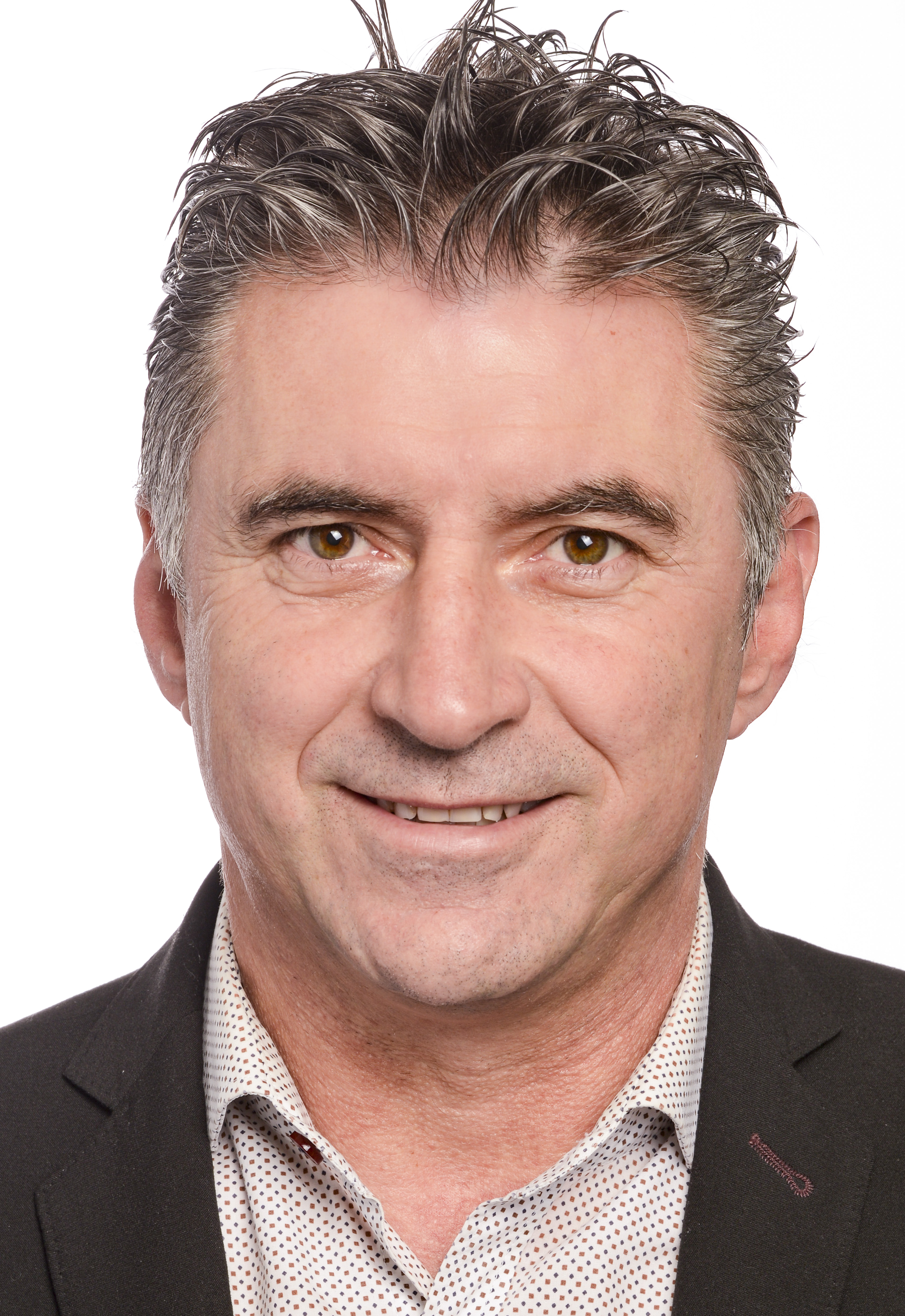
- Zagorakis in 2019

Member of the European Parliament
- In office 1 July 2014 – 16 July 2024

President of Hellenic Football Federation
- In office 27 March 2021 – 8 September 2021
- Preceded by: Evangelos Grammenos
- Succeeded by: Panagiotis Dimitriou

President of PAOK
- In office 18 June 2007 – 8 October 2009
- Preceded by: Nikolaos Vezyrtzis
- Succeeded by: Zisis Vryzas
- In office 28 January 2010 – 20 January 2012
- Preceded by: Zisis Vryzas
- Succeeded by: Zisis Vryzas

Personal details
- Born: 27 October 1971 (age 54) Lydia, Kavala, Greece
- Party: New Democracy (2014–2024); European People's Party Group (2014–2024); Independent (2020)
- Profession: Politician
Association football career
- Full name: Theodoros Zagorakis
- Height: 1.78 m (5 ft 10 in)
- Position: Midfielder
Youth career
- 1987–1988: Doxa Lydia
Senior career*
Years	Team	Apps	(Gls)
1988–1992	Kavala	114	(6)
1992–1998	PAOK	155	(10)
1998–2000	Leicester City	50	(3)
2000–2004	AEK Athens	101	(4)
2004–2005	Bologna	32	(0)
2005–2007	PAOK	45	(0)
Total		497	(23)
International career
1994–2007	Greece	120	(3)
Medal record
Men's football
Representing Greece
UEFA European Championship
Winner	2004
- * Club domestic league appearances and goals

Theodoros Zagorakis (Greek: Θεόδωρος Ζαγοράκης [θeˈoðoɾos zaɣoˈɾacis]; born 27 October 1971) is a Greek politician and former professional footballer who played as a midfielder. He was the captain of the Greece team that won UEFA Euro 2004, and was also captain and later president of PAOK. He was named the Greek Male Athlete of the Year in 2004.

He was elected as a Greek MEP at the May 2014 and May 2019 European Parliament Elections. He was also the president of the Hellenic Football Federation from March to September 2021.

== Club career ==
=== Kavala ===
Zagorakis was a central midfielder who could also play on the right side of midfield. He started his career with Kavala in 1988, the club that also produced Zisis Vryzas, with whom he became close friends. He was an important part of helping the team get into the Beta Ethniki.

=== PAOK ===
In the 1992–93 season, Zagorakis left Kavala as a winter transfer to join PAOK, part of a string of star transfers made that season. He played for PAOK until December 1997, and also captained the squad in his last two seasons. He rarely missed a league derby and scored important goals, particularly in 1994–95 when he struck four, his best-ever tally.

=== Leicester City ===
Zagorakis left for English club Leicester City the following winter and signed for Martin O'Neill's side in 1998. While in England, he took part in two consecutive League Cup finals at Wembley Stadium, losing the first against Tottenham Hotspur in 1999 and defeating Tranmere Rovers in the second, though he was an unused substitute in the latter. Zagorakis will always be fondly known by Leicester fans for his sheer determination in midfield and also his goalkeeping cameo against Crystal Palace, in a 3–3 draw, where he went in goal after Pegguy Arphexad and then Tim Flowers went off injured.

=== AEK Athens ===
Zagorakis was disappointed with Leicester manager Martin O'Neill's reluctance to use him regularly. Thus, he decided to return to Greece and on 3 July 2000 he signed for AEK Athens. There, he played alongside fellow countrymen such as Michalis Kapsis, Vasilios Lakis, Demis Nikolaidis and Vasilios Tsiartas. He formed an excellent duo in midfield with both Akis Zikos and Kostas Katsouranis, helping with his game in the defensive part and also in the organization of the offense, where he also competed at times as a captain. A goal with AEK was against Inter Milan at Giuseppe Meazza with a great shot for the round of 16 of the UEFA Cup. With AEK, Zagorakis won the Greek Cup in 2002 against rivals Olympiacos.

Zagorakis, during his last season in AEK, has accepted a reduced pay-off which is reported to be £220,000. "He showed he genuinely has the club's best interests at heart and is free to take up any of the great offers from teams abroad," said a club statement.

In the summer of 2004, having the best moment of his career at the Euro in Portugal and with AEK in a difficult administrative situation, he left the team.

=== Bologna ===
On 14 July 2004, he signed for Bologna, signing a two-year contract worth €1.5 million per year. Zagorakis–who was voted player of the tournament in Portugal–was released by AEK Athens and joined Bologna on a Bosman free transfer. "Zagorakis is our Greek Baggio", Bologna owner Giuseppe Gazzoni Frascara told the newspaper.

In 2004–05, Zagorakis was a regular feature in the squad, but the team found itself relegated to Serie B after a play-out series against Parma. In the following summer, he was released from the team as they couldn't afford his payroll under the new conditions.

=== Return to PAOK ===
In 2005, Zagorakis arrived in Thessaloniki to sign a deal with PAOK. The midfielder was released by Bologna following the Italian team's relegation from Serie A, and rejoined one of his old clubs. Zagorakis eventually signed a two-year contract with PAOK for €700,000 a year. When Zagorakis landed at Makedonia Airport in Thessaloniki, 7,000 supporters were there to welcome him back. His return however coincided with a turbulent period, with the club many financial and administrative problems. On 28 May 2007, after the fifth Greek Super League All-Star Game, Zagorakis announced his retirement from professional football.

== International career ==
Zagorakis received his first cap for Greece on 7 September 1994, against the Faroe Islands. He scored his first goal against Denmark in 2006 World Cup qualifying, in Athens, while earning his 101st cap. Numbering 120 caps, Zagorakis was Greece's all-time leader in international games played until 12 October 2012, when Giorgos Karagounis made his 121st appearance for the national team. He earned his 100th against Kazakhstan on 17 November 2004, and was the team's longest-serving captain.

Zagorakis played an important role in Greece's win in the 2004 European Championships, and was named the Player of the Tournament by UEFA and consequently he was in the Team of the Tournament. FIFA named Zagorakis as a contender for the 2004 FIFA World Player of the Year award (he finished in 17th place alongside Spain's and Real Madrid's legend, Raúl), as well as UEFA named him for the 2004 Ballon d'Or award (he finished in fifth place), behind the likes of Ronaldinho (third place) and Thierry Henry (fourth place). He holds the record of most consecutive matches (57) (except one in 2006 because of injury) of the national team (due to either injury or not selection) since his first cap in a period of 12 years.

After 12 full playing years as the captain for Greece, Zagorakis announced his retirement from international football on 5 October 2006. More specifically, Greece captain was considering retiring after his team's European championship qualifier against Norway in Athens on 2 October 2006, has also been called up for the match against Bosnia four days later, officials said. On 22 August 2007, however, he played for the last time with the national side, in a special friendly match against Spain in Toumba Stadium, Salonica. He played for about 15 minutes and was then replaced by Giannis Goumas, receiving an applause by fans singing his name.

== PAOK presidency ==
Following his retirement as a footballer, after many widespread rumours, it was announced that he was to become PAOK's new president, on 18 June 2007.

The club had been in dire financial straits for several years. Zagorakis undertook to sort out finances by attracting investors, increasing revenue and mobilising the club's fan base. In his unifying first statement he said: "The strength of PAOK lies in its supporters, its fans...I would have not made this decision" (to retire from playing and assume administration) "if i did not love my club. The situation for PAOK is very difficult and I will not try to hide its problems; instead I will do all I can to solve the pressing financial issues".

Soon, he set about restructuring the club's debt and team, and recruited former teammate Zisis Vryzas as technical director. As of late 2008, PAOK has been able to pay off most of its accumulated debt, seen a steady increase in ticket sales and advertising revenue, and team performance on the field has improved considerably, under the coaching of Portuguese manager Fernando Santos.

On 15 December 2008, Zagorakis announced a major issue of new stock by the club, valued at €22.3 million. He appealed to small investors and stated that, although it is unlikely that the entire sum could be covered in a worldwide crisis environment, he felt confident that the expected influx of capital would enable PAOK finally to put its past problems behind and focus on future growth.

On 8 October 2009, Zagorakis surprised fans and press alike by announcing his decision to quit the presidency. In a short announcement on the club's official website, he cited that personal problems have led him to this decision. He was rapidly replaced by his close friend Zisis Vryzas.

Nevertheless, he kept close contact with his former associates, and also frequently attended the club's home games alongside Vryzas. Zagorakis finally changed his mind and, on 20 January, he reprised his position as president, with Vryzas stepping down to assume the post of vice-president.

In January 2012, Zagorakis resigned as president after the sale of Vieirinha for financial reasons provoked a supporters' protest.

== Style of play ==
Zagorakis was described by UEFA.com as a "combative, industrious defensive midfielder with a powerful right-foot shot".

== Personal life ==
Zagorakis was featured on the cover of the Greek edition of FIFA 2001.

== Political career ==
Zagorakis is looking to kick-off a new career in politics by becoming a Member of the European Parliament (MEP). He was a New Democracy candidate for the European Parliament in the elections of 25 May 2014. He was elected as an MEP and became a member of the European People's Party (Christian Democrats). He was unveiled as one of the party's hopefuls by the Greek Prime Minister, Antonis Samaras. He was re-elected in the European Parliament in the elections of 2019. In January 2020, a Committee of Professional Sports (with members placed by Sports Minister Lefteris Avgenakis) proposed the relegation of PAOK and Xanthi. Zagorakis stated that he could no longer be MEP for New Democracy after this. The party's leader and PM Kyriakos Mitsotakis decided his deletion. Several MP's said that Zagorakis was elected in European Parliament to represent Greece, not PAOK. Nevertheless, in 2021, Zagorakis returned to New Democracy and its group of MEPs. In the 2024 European elections, he was announced as a candidate for PASOK, but he was not elected.

== President of Hellenic Football Federation ==
Theodoros Zagorakis served as the president of the Hellenic Football Federation (EPO). He was elected to the position in March 2021. He was supported by Greece's major football clubs and was elected with an almost unanimous majority. He aimed to reform Greek football, which had faced serious corruption and governance challenges. However, his tenure as president was relatively short, as he resigned from the position in September 2021 due to disagreements and challenges related to the federation's governance.

== Career statistics ==
=== Club ===
Appearances and goals by club, season and competition
Club	Season	League			National Cup		League Cup		Continental		Total	
Club	Season	Division	Apps	Goals	Apps	Goals	Apps	Goals	Apps	Goals	Apps	Goals
Kavala	1988–89	Beta Ethniki	8	2	1	0	–		–		9	2
Kavala	1989–90	Gamma Ethniki	38	2	2	0	–		–		40	2
Kavala	1990–91	Beta Ethniki	28	0	0	0	–		–		28	0
Kavala	1991–92	Beta Ethniki	32	2	1	0	–		–		33	2
Kavala	1992–93	Beta Ethniki	8	0	0	0	–		–		8	0
Kavala	Total		114	6	4	0	–		–		118	6
PAOK	1992–93	Alpha Ethniki	20	2	1	0	–		0	0	21	2
PAOK	1993–94	Alpha Ethniki	30	0	5	1	–		–		35	1
PAOK	1994–95	Alpha Ethniki	31	4	4	0	–		–		35	4
PAOK	1995–96	Alpha Ethniki	27	0	7	1	–		–		34	1
PAOK	1996–97	Alpha Ethniki	32	2	3	0	–		–		35	2
PAOK	1997–98	Alpha Ethniki	15	2	2	0	–		6	3	23	5
PAOK	Total		155	10	22	2	–		6	3	183	15
Leicester City	1997–98	Premier League	14	1	0	0	0	0	0	0	14	1
Leicester City	1998–99	Premier League	19	1	2	0	5	0	0	0	26	1
Leicester City	1999–2000	Premier League	17	1	4	0	7	0	0	0	28	1
Leicester City	Total		50	3	6	0	13	0	0	0	69	3
AEK	2000–01	Alpha Ethniki	23	1	5	0	–		7	0	35	1
AEK	2001–02	Alpha Ethniki	26	3	9	1	–		10	4	45	8
AEK	2002–03	Alpha Ethniki	25	0	7	1	–		11	1	43	2
AEK	2003–04	Alpha Ethniki	27	0	5	0	–		8	0	40	0
AEK	Total		101	4	26	2	–		36	5	163	11
Bologna	2004–05	Serie A	32	0	2	0	–		–		34	0
PAOK	2005–06	Alpha Ethniki	22	0	0	0	–		5	0	27	0
PAOK	2006–07	Super League Greece	23	0	4	0	–		–		27	0
PAOK	Total		45	0	4	0	–		5	0	54	0
Career total			497	23	64	4	13	0	47	8	621	35

=== International ===
Appearances and goals by national team and year
National team	Year	Apps	Goals
Greece	1994	4	0
Greece	1995	11	0
Greece	1996	9	0
Greece	1997	9	0
Greece	1998	4	0
Greece	1999	13	0
Greece	2000	5	0
Greece	2001	9	0
Greece	2002	10	0
Greece	2003	10	0
Greece	2004	16	0
Greece	2005	11	1
Greece	2006	8	2
Greece	2007	1	0
Total		120	3

Scores and results list Greece's goal tally first, score column indicates score after each Zagorakis goal.

List of international goals scored by Theodoros Zagorakis
No.	Date	Venue	Opponent	Score	Result	Competition
1	9 February 2005	Karaiskakis Stadium, Piraeus, Greece	Denmark	1–0	2–1	2006 FIFA World Cup Qualifiers
2	21 January 2006	King Fahd International Stadium, Riyadh, Saudi Arabia	South Korea	1–0	1–1	Friendly
3	25 January 2006	King Fahd International Stadium, Riyadh, Saudi Arabia	Saudi Arabia	1–0	1–1	Friendly

== Honours ==
Leicester City

- Football League Cup: 1999–2000; runner-up: 1998–99

AEK Athens

- Greek Cup: 2001–02

Greece

- UEFA European Championship: 2004

Individual

- PAOK MVP of the Season: 1996–97
- UEFA Euro 2004 Player of the tournament
- UEFA Euro 2004 Team of the Tournament
- UEFA Euro 2004 final Man of the Match
- Greek Male Athlete of the Year: 2004

== See also ==
- List of men's footballers with 100 or more international caps
