= Robert Ullathorne =

English footballer and agent

Personal information
- Full name: Robert Ullathorne
- Date of birth: 11 October 1971 (age 55)
- Place of birth: Wakefield, England
- Position: Defender

Youth career
- Norwich City

Senior career*
Years	Team	Apps	(Gls)
1990–1996	Norwich City	94	(7)
1996–1997	Osasuna	18	(0)
1997–2000	Leicester City	31	(1)
2000–2003	Sheffield United	40	(0)
2004	Northampton Town	13	(1)
2004–2006	Notts County	69	(0)
Total		267	(9)

International career
1990	England U18	1	(0)
- * Club domestic league appearances and goals

Robert Ullathorne (born 11 October 1971) is an English former professional footballer and football agent.

He was a defender who played from 1988 to 2006, notably in the Premier League for Norwich City and Leicester City and in La Liga for Osasuna. He also appeared in the Football League for Sheffield United, Northampton Town and Notts County.

== Club career ==
=== Norwich City ===
Predominantly a left-sided defender or midfielder Ullathorne was a successful product of Norwich City youth team in the late 1980s. He chose to join Norwich City despite having schoolboy trials with the likes of Everton, Cambridge United, West Ham United and Luton Town.

Having turned professional at Carrow Road during 1990, Ullathorne made his first start for Norwich on 22 April 1991 in an away fixture against Nottingham Forest, scoring his first goal against Notts County the following season. Ullathorne went on to make a total of 115 appearances scoring eight goals in the process, including a UEFA cup appearance against Inter Milan at the San Siro during Norwich City's unsuccessful run in 1993–94, having qualified for the UEFA Cup with a third-place finish in the new FA Premier League. He was with the Canaries when they were relegated from the Premier League in 1994–95, and spent one more season at Carrow Road, making 29 appearances in Division One, but was unable to help the Canaries win promotion.

=== Osasuna ===
After having been at Norwich for eight years, Ullathorne was subject of interest from Crystal Palace, but took the opportunity of a move to Spanish Segunda División side Osasuna on a free transfer, the first under the Bosman ruling from England, where he was joined by fellow Englishman Jamie Pollock, who arrived from Middlesbrough later in 1996.

Ullathorne spent eight months in Spain, before leaving to return to England in a £650,000 transfer to Leicester City in February 1997. He played 18 league matches for Osasuna.

=== Leicester City ===
With a chance of reaching a Wembley cup final, on 17 February 1997, Ullathorne decided to return to the Premier League to play for Leicester City in a deal worth £650,000. Ullathorne's hopes of playing in a cup final were dashed after only eleven minutes of his debut against Wimbledon in a League Cup semi-final first leg, when he suffered a broken leg and a dislocated ankle and was substituted. His teammates went on to win the 1997 Football League Cup final in his absence.

Ullathorne recovered from the injury for the 1997–98 season, and was a regular in the Leicester City first team during the 1998–99 season, showing his versatility by playing in numerous positions. Ullathorne had an impressive game for Leicester in the 1999 League Cup final, where he kept David Ginola quiet throughout the game. However, Tottenham Hotspur won the game with a last minute goal, depriving Ullathorne of silverware.

Playing well during the 1998–99 season and attracting numerous clubs for his signature including a possible return to his old club Osasuna, Ullathorne's career was thrown into disarray when he broke his leg at Chelsea on 18 April 1999, which raised real questions about his future. He scored two goals during his spell at Leicester, scoring once against Blackburn Rovers in the league. and once against Birmingham City in the FA Cup.

=== Later career ===
Ullathorne left Leicester at the end of the 1999–2000 season, joining Newcastle United briefly on trial, before signing for Sheffield United as a free agent in December 2000. He played 14 games for United up until the end of the season. Ullathorne re-signed for the Yorkshire club again in November 2001. In his second spell, he played 26 league games during an injury plagued season and was released at the end of the 2002–03 season, signing for Northampton Town. At Northampton, Ullathorne made 13 league appearances, scoring the winning goal against Mansfield Town on the last day of the season, his goal clinching the Cobblers' place in the Division Three play-offs. Their opponents in the play-off semi final were Mansfield. However, Ullathorne was unable to prevent his team from losing on penalties. He then signed for Notts County, where he spent his last two seasons, scoring once in the League Cup against Bradford City.

== International career ==
Ullathorne made his only appearance for England U18 on 25 April 1990 during the 1–1 draw against Czechoslovakia U18.

== After Football ==
In November 2011, Ullathorne became a Licensed Players' Agent by The FA and is working with sports management company Elite Sports Properties.

== Honours ==
Leicester City

- Football League Cup runner-up: 1998–99
