= 1998–99 Football League Cup =

League Cup Worthington Cup

Tournament details
- Country: England; Wales
- Teams: 92

Final positions
- Champions: Tottenham Hotspur (3rd title)
- Runners-up: Leicester City

Tournament statistics
- Top goal scorer(s): Gianluca Vialli (6 goals)

The 1998–99 Football League Cup (known as the Worthington Cup for sponsorship reasons) was the 39th staging of the Football League Cup, a knockout competition for England's top 92 football clubs.

The competition began on 11 August 1998, and ended with the final on 21 March 1999, held at Wembley Stadium.

The tournament was won by Tottenham Hotspur, who beat Leicester City 1–0 in the final, thanks to an Allan Nielsen goal in the last minute of normal time.

== First round ==
The 72 First, Second and Third Division clubs compete from the First Round. Each section is divided equally into a pot of seeded clubs and a pot of unseeded clubs. Clubs' rankings depend upon their finishing position in the 1997–98 season.

Tie no	Home team^{1}	(1st Leg) (2nd Leg) Aggregate	Away team
1	Barnet	(2–1) (0–5); 2–6	Wolverhampton Wanderers
2	Birmingham City	(2–0) (1–1); 3–1	Millwall
3	Blackpool	(1–0) (1–1); 2–1	Scunthorpe United
4	Bolton Wanderers	(1–0) (3–0); 4–0	Hartlepool United
5	Bradford City	(1–1) (1–0); 2–1	Lincoln City
6	Bristol City	(4–0) (3–4); 7–4	Shrewsbury Town
7	Bury	(1–1) (4–1); 5–2	Burnley
8	Cambridge United	(1–0) (1–1); 2–1	Watford
9	Exeter City	(1–1) (1–5); 2–6	Ipswich Town
10	Fulham	(2–1) (2–1); 4–2	Cardiff City
11	Grimsby Town	(0–0) (0–0); 0–0	Preston North End
After extra time — Grimsby Town win on penalties
12	Huddersfield Town	(3–2) (1–1); 4–3	Mansfield Town
13	Leyton Orient	(1–1) (2–1); 3–2	Bristol Rovers
14	Luton Town	(2–3) (3–1); 5–4	Oxford United
15	Macclesfield Town	(3–1) (0–1); 3–2	Stoke City
16	Northampton Town	(2–1) (1–1); 3–2	Brighton & Hove Albion
17	Notts County	(0–2) (1–7); 1–9	Manchester City
18	Oldham Athletic	(3–2) (0–2); 3–4	Crewe Alexandra
19	Peterborough United	(1–1) (0–2); 1–3	Reading
20	Plymouth Argyle	(1–3) (2–3); 3–6	Portsmouth
21	Port Vale	(1–2) (2–2); 3–4	Chester City
22	Rotherham United	(0–1) (0–2); 0–3	Chesterfield
23	Scarborough	(0–1) (0–3); 0–4	Barnsley
24	Sheffield United	(3–1) (2–2); 5–3	Darlington
25	Southend United	(1–0) (1–0); 2–0	Gillingham
26	Stockport County	(2–2) (0–0); 2–2	Hull City
After extra time — Hull City win on away goals
27	Swansea City	(1–1) (0–1); 1–2	Norwich City
28	Swindon Town	(2–1) (0–2); 2–3	Wycombe Wanderers
29	Torquay United	(1–1) (1–2); 2–3	Crystal Palace
30	Tranmere Rovers	(3–0) (1–0); 4–0	Carlisle United
31	Walsall	(0–0) (1–3); 1–3	QPR
32	West Bromwich Albion	(2–1) (0–3); 2–4	Brentford
33	Wigan Athletic	(1–0) (1–0); 2–0	Rochdale
34	Wrexham	(0–2) (2–0); 2–2	Halifax Town
After extra time — Halifax Town win on penalties
35	York City	(0–2) (1–2); 1–4	Sunderland
36	Bournemouth	(2–0) (2–3); 4–3	Colchester United

^{1} Team at home in the 1st leg is denoted as the home team

== Second round ==
The 36 winners from the First Round joined the 12 Premier League clubs not participating in European competition in Round Two. First leg matches were played on 15 and 16 September, second leg matches were played on 22 and 23 September.

Tie no	Home team^{1}	(1st Leg) (2nd Leg) Aggregate	Away team
1	Bristol City	(1–1) (0–2); 1–3	Crewe Alexandra
2	Coventry City	(1–0) (4–0); 5–0	Southend United
3	Derby County	(1–1) (1–0); 2–1	Manchester City
4	Leicester City	(3–0) (3–1); 6–1	Chesterfield
5	Middlesbrough	(2–0) (1–1); 3–1	Wycombe Wanderers
6	Norwich City	(1–0) (3–2); 4–2	Wigan Athletic
7	Q.P.R.	(0–2) (0–1); 0–3	Charlton Athletic
8	Sheffield Wednesday	(0–1) (1–1); 1–2	Cambridge United
9	Barnsley	(3–0) (1–1); 4–1	Reading
10	Blackpool	(2–1) (1–3); 3–4	Tranmere Rovers
11	Bolton Wanderers	(3–1) (3–2); 6–3	Hull City
12	Bournemouth	(1–1) (2–1); 3–2	Wolverhampton Wanderers
13	Brentford	(2–3) (2–3); 4–6	Tottenham Hotspur
14	Bury	(3–0) (1–2); 4–2	Crystal Palace
15	Fulham	(1–1) (1–0); 2–1	Southampton
16	Halifax Town	(1–2) (1–3); 2–5	Bradford City
17	Huddersfield Town	(1–1) (1–2); 2–3	Everton
18	Ipswich Town	(2–1) (2–4); 4–5	Luton Town
19	Leyton Orient	(1–5) (0–0); 1–5	Nottingham Forest
20	Macclesfield Town	(0–3) (0–6); 0–9	Birmingham City
21	Northampton Town	(2–0) (0–1); 2–1	West Ham
22	Portsmouth	(2–1) (1–4); 3–5	Wimbledon
23	Sheffield United	(2–1) (0–2); 2–3	Grimsby Town
24	Sunderland	(3–0) (1–0); 4–0	Chester City

^{1} Team at home in the 1st leg is denoted as the home team

== Third round ==
The 24 winners from the Second Round joined the 8 Premiership clubs participating in European competition in Round Three. Matches were played on 27 and 28 October.

Tie no	Home team	Score	Away team	Date
1	Barnsley	2–1	Bournemouth	27 October 1998
2	Charlton Athletic	1–2	Leicester City	27 October 1998
3	Liverpool	3–1	Fulham	27 October 1998
4	Luton Town	2–0	Coventry City	27 October 1998
5	Northampton Town	1–3	Tottenham Hotspur	27 October 1998
6	Norwich City	1–1	Bolton Wanderers	27 October 1998
After extra time — Bolton Wanderers win 3–1 on penalties
7	Nottingham Forest	3–3	Cambridge United	27 October 1998
After extra time — Nottingham Forest win 4–3 on penalties
8	Sunderland	2–1	Grimsby Town	27 October 1998
9	Tranmere Rovers	0–1	Newcastle United	27 October 1998
10	Birmingham City	1–2	Wimbledon	28 October 1998
11	Chelsea	4–1	Aston Villa	28 October 1998
12	Crewe Alexandra	0–1	Blackburn Rovers	28 October 1998
13	Derby County	1–2	Arsenal	28 October 1998
14	Leeds United	1–0	Bradford City	28 October 1998
15	Manchester United	2–0	Bury	28 October 1998
16	Middlesbrough	2–3	Everton	28 October 1998

== Fourth round ==
Matches were played on 10 and 11 November.

1998-11-10

Bolton Wanderers	1–2	Wimbledon
Jensen 52'		Gayle 16'; Kennedy 63'

Reebok Stadium, Bolton
Attendance: 7,868
Referee: Andy D'Urso

1998-11-10

Liverpool	1–3	Tottenham Hotspur
Owen 81'		Iversen 2'; Scales 20'; Nielsen 62'

Anfield, Liverpool
Attendance: 20,772
Referee: Gary Willard

1998-11-10

Luton Town	1–0	Barnsley
Gray 81'

Kenilworth Road, Luton
Attendance: 8,435
Referee: Steve Bennett

1998-11-11

Arsenal	0–5	Chelsea
		Leboeuf 34' (pen.); Vialli 49', 73'; Poyet 65', 80'

Highbury, London
Attendance: 37,562
Referee: David Elleray

1998-11-11

Everton	1–1 (a.e.t.)	Sunderland
Collins 74'		Bridges 29'
Penalties
	4–5

Goodison Park, Liverpool
Attendance: 28,132
Referee: Mike Reed

1998-11-11

Leicester City	2–1	Leeds United
Izzet 88'; Parker 90' (pen.)		Kewell 17'

Filbert Street, Leicester
Attendance: 20,161
Referee: Paul Durkin

1998-11-11

Manchester United	2–1	Nottingham Forest
Solskjær 57', 60'		Stone 68'

Old Trafford, Manchester
Attendance: 37,237
Referee: Rob Harris

1998-11-11

Newcastle United	1–1 (a.e.t.)	Blackburn Rovers
Shearer 9'		Sherwood 30'
Penalties
	2–4

St James' Park, Newcastle
Attendance: 34,702
Referee: Neale Barry

== Quarter-finals ==
The four matches were played on 1, and 2 December.

1998-12-01

Sunderland	3–0	Luton Town
Johnson 40' (o.g.); Bridges 89'; McCann 90'

Stadium of Light, Sunderland
Attendance: 35,742
Referee: Eddie Lomas

1998-12-01

Wimbledon	2–1	Chelsea
Earle 20'; Hughes 75' (pen.)		Vialli 85'

Selhurst Park, London
Attendance: 19,286
Referee: Graham Poll

1998-12-02

Leicester City	1–0	Blackburn Rovers
Lennon 67'

Filbert Street, Leicester
Attendance: 19,442
Referee: Alan Wilkie

1998-12-02

Tottenham Hotspur	3–1	Manchester United
Armstrong 48', 55'; Ginola 86'		Sheringham 71'

White Hart Lane, London
Attendance: 35,702
Referee: Peter Jones

== Semi-finals ==
The semi-final draw was made in December 1998 after the conclusion of the quarter finals. Unlike the other rounds, the semi-final ties were played over two legs, with each team playing one leg at home. The first leg matches were played on 26 and 27 January 1999, the second leg matches were played on 16 and 17 February 1999. It was a narrow victory for Tottenham Hotspur and Leicester City at the expense of Wimbledon and Sunderland, respectively, giving Tottenham the first chance of their major trophy–and place in Europe–for eight years, while Leicester had reached their second final in three seasons.

=== First leg ===
1999-01-26
19:45

Sunderland	1–2	Leicester City
McCann 75'		Cottee 30', 62'

Stadium of Light, Sunderland
Attendance: 38,332
Referee: Graham Barber

1999-01-27
20:05

Tottenham Hotspur	0–0	Wimbledon

White Hart Lane, London
Attendance: 35,997
Referee: Steve Dunn

=== Second leg ===
1999-02-16
20:05

Wimbledon	0–1	Tottenham Hotspur
		Iversen 39'

Selhurst Park, London
Attendance: 25,204
Referee: Gary Willard

Tottenham Hotspur win 1-0 on aggregate

1999-02-17
19:45

Leicester City	1–1	Sunderland
Cottee 54'		Quinn 34'

Filbert Street, Leicester
Attendance: 21,231
Referee: David Elleray

Leicester City win 3-2 on aggregate

== Final ==
The 1999 Worthington Cup Final was played on 21 March 1999 and was contested between Tottenham Hotspur and Leicester City at Wembley Stadium. Tottenham won the match 1–0 thanks to a last minute Allan Nielsen header.

1999-03-21
15:00

Leicester City	0–1	Tottenham Hotspur
	Report	Nielsen 90'

Wembley Stadium, London
Attendance: 77,892
Referee: Terry Heilbron
