= Pegguy Arphexad =

French association football player (born 1973)

Personal information
- Date of birth: 18 May 1973 (age 53)
- Place of birth: Les Abymes, Guadeloupe
- Height: 1.88 m (6 ft 2 in)
- Position: Goalkeeper

Senior career*
Years	Team	Apps	(Gls)
1989–1991	Brest	2	(0)
1992–1997	Lens	3	(0)
1996–1997	→ Lille (loan)	2	(0)
1997–2000	Leicester City	21	(0)
2000–2003	Liverpool	2	(0)
2001	→ Stockport County (loan)	3	(0)
2003–2004	Coventry City	5	(0)
2004	→ Notts County (loan)	3	(0)
2004–2005	Marseille	0	(0)
Total		41	(0)

International career
1994	France U21	1	(0)
- * Club domestic league appearances and goals

Pegguy Arphexad (born 18 May 1973) is a French former professional footballer who played as a goalkeeper.

== Early life ==
Arphexad was born in Les Abymes, Guadeloupe.

== Club career ==
Arphexad began in the French League with Brest, where he made his league debut in november 1991 in the absence of first-choice Sergio Goycochea. He made one more league appearance for Brest before the club was pulled from the league in December 1991 due to bankruptcy. He then signed for Lens, whom he helped win the Coupe Gambardella in 1992. He was confined to a role as backup during his time at Lens and only played in the last three matches of the 1995–96 Division 1. The next season, he played in two league matches on loan for Lille.

=== Leicester City ===
In August 1997, Arphexad began his time in the Premier League with Leicester City. During Leicester's successful 1999–2000 League Cup campaign, he started ahead of Tim Flowers and saved two crucial penalties in a penalty shootout against Fulham in the quarter-final. He earned his first ever winner's medal as an unused substitute in the final. In that season he also came on as a substitute for the injured Flowers in Leicester's penalty shootout win over Arsenal in an FA Cup fourth round replay, saving penalties from Lee Dixon and Gilles Grimandi as Leicester progressed. Arphexad played a big role in Liverpool's failure to qualify for the UEFA Champions League in 1999–2000. He produced an inspired performance to deny the Reds a much needed three points at Anfield in May 2000. His heroics that night clearly impressed Gérard Houllier, who moved swiftly to sign Arphexad on a free transfer under the Bosman ruling during the summer. Arphexad claimed that he would have stayed at Leicester had he been guaranteed a role as the first-choice keeper, but the arrival of Flowers after the departure of Kasey Keller meant that he felt that he had the option of being a backup at a mid-table club or a backup at a club challenging for the title.

=== Liverpool ===
Arphexad won six medals with Liverpool, all as an unused substitute. These included three in Liverpool's treble winning 2000–01 season, where they won the FA Cup, the League Cup and the UEFA Cup. Two subsequent medals followed the following season as Liverpool claimed both the Charity Shield and the European Super Cup. In the 2001–02 season, he was the starting goalkeeper in the opening match that ended in a 2–1 win against West Ham United. His second and last league appearance for Liverpool was on 9 February 2002 in a 6–0 win against Ipswich Town, replacing Jerzy Dudek during the second half.

Arphexad earned a second League Cup winners medal in the 2002–03 season and was released by Liverpool that summer, later having spells with Coventry City and Notts County. He also rejected a move to Chester City claiming that he would not be prepared to join a club playing lower than the Second Division.

== International career ==
Arphexad made one appearance for the France national under-21 team in 1994.

== After football ==
Rumours surfaced online that Arphexad turned to making pornographic content after a failed career in acting. However, in an interview with the Leicester Mercury, he stated the rumours were not true, whilst going on to say that he now works in sports insurance. He currently works for Miller Sports + Entertainment, previously known as Henner Sports as a European Business Officer.

== Honours ==
Leicester City

- Football League Cup: 1999–2000; runner-up: 1998–99

Liverpool

- FA Cup: 2000–01
- Football League Cup: 2000–01, 2002–03
- FA Charity Shield: 2001
- UEFA Cup: 2000–01
- UEFA Super Cup: 2001
