= Paul Franklin (footballer) =

English footballer and coach

Personal information
- Date of birth: 5 October 1963 (age 63)
- Place of birth: Ilford, England
- Height: 6 ft 0 in (1.83 m)
- Position: Central defender

Youth career
- 19xx–1983: Watford

Senior career*
Years	Team	Apps	(Gls)
1983–1987	Watford	32	(0)
1986	→ Shrewsbury Town (loan)	6	(0)
1987	→ Swindon Town (loan)	5	(1)
1987–1989	Reading	20	(0)
1989–1990	Wycombe Wanderers	?	(?)
Total		63	(1)

Managerial career
- 1990–1995: Wycombe Wanderers (coach)
- 1995: Norwich City
- 1995–2000: Leicester City (coach)
- 2000–2006: Norwich United
- 2007: Diss Town
- * Club domestic league appearances and goals

Paul Franklin (born 5 October 1963) is an English football coach and former professional player.

== Career ==
=== Playing career ===
Franklin, who played as a central defender, began his career at Watford, making 32 appearances in the Football League between his debut in May 1983 and 1987. While at Watford, Franklin spent loan spells at Shrewsbury Town and Swindon Town. Franklin later signed for Reading, making 20 League appearances over the next two seasons, before dropping into non-League football with Wycombe Wanderers.

=== Coaching career ===
After retiring as a player, Franklin worked as a coach at Wycombe Wanderers, Norwich City (also being caretaker manager for one game in 1995) and Leicester City, before later managing non-League sides Norwich United and Diss Town.
