= Sam McMahon (footballer) =

English footballer

Personal information
- Full name: Sam McMahon
- Date of birth: 10 February 1976 (age 50)
- Place of birth: Newark, England
- Height: 1.75 m (5 ft 9 in)
- Position: Midfielder

Youth career
- 1992–1994: Leicester City

Senior career*
Years	Team	Apps	(Gls)
1994–1999	Leicester City	6	(1)
1999	Cambridge United	3	(0)
1999–2003	Stevenage	64	(6)
2003–2004	Burton Albion	16	(0)
2004–2005	Hinckley United	19	(2)
2005–2006	King's Lynn	71	(7)
2006–2008	Stamford	?	(?)
- * Club domestic league appearances and goals

Sam McMahon (born 10 February 1976) is an English former professional association footballer who played as a midfielder from 1994 to 2008.

He played in the Premier League for Leicester City, before moving into the English Football League with Cambridge United. The final nine years of his career were played in non-league football, for Stevenage Borough, Burton Albion, Hinckley United, King's Lynn and Stamford.

== Playing career ==
He started his career with Leicester City in 1994, but was on the fringes of the first team. He then had a brief spell with Cambridge United in 1999, before signing for Stevenage Borough, where his stay was marred by injuries. He was released in 2003. He then had trials with Kettering and Burton Albion and eventually signed for the latter, spending one season, also having problems with injuries, which again caused him to be released.

He joined Hinckley United and in 2005 joined King's Lynn for one season. Then he joined Stamford, where he finished his career.

== Coaching career ==
He retired and took the job as football development officer at Judgemeadow Community College in Leicester.
