= John Elsom =

English football chairman (1939–2023)

- Born: Jonathan Elsom; 10 August 1939; Loughborough, England
- Died: 15 August 2023 (aged 84)
- Occupation: Businessman
- Known for: Former chairman of Leicester City and director of Grimsby Town

Jonathan Elsom (10 August 1939 – 15 August 2023) was an English association football football chairman and club director.

Elsom was chairman of Leicester City and had served on the board of the Football League and was a member of the Football Association (FA) Council. He later served on the board of directors as club president of Grimsby Town.

== Business ==
Elsom was the chairman of the Page and Moy Travel group.

== Football ==
=== Leicester City ===
Elsom was chairman of Leicester City F.C. from 1998 until mid-2002. During his tenure as chairman the club finished in mid-table in the Premier League, took part in the 1999 and 2000 League Cup Finals, and competed in the UEFA Cup. He also gave them a new stadium, the 32,000-seat Walkers Stadium, which opened for the 2002-03 season as a replacement for 111-year-old Filbert Street. However, his chairmanship of the club came to an end after the 2001-02 season when the Foxes had been relegated from the Premier League and were more than £30million in debt.

=== Grimsby Town ===
Elsom was co-opted onto the board of directors of Grimsby Town Football Club in December 2002. Elsom stepped down and retired from his role 8 August 2013 and in turn was appointed club president.

== Personal life and death ==
Jonathan Elsom was born in Loughborough on 10 August 1939. His family came from Brigg, North Lincolnshire.

Elsom died on 15 August 2023, at the age of 84. Leicester City announced his death the following day by stating "John’s tenure at Leicester City as vice-president, director and chairman was an extremely significant time in the history of the club and he will be remembered for his major contributions during those years. Leicester City Football Club’s thoughts are with John’s family and friends at this sad time."
