= Gary Neil =

Scottish footballer

Personal information
- Full name: Gary Derek Campbell Neil
- Date of birth: 16 August 1978 (age 48)
- Place of birth: Glasgow, Scotland
- Position: Midfielder

Youth career
- –1997: Leicester City

Senior career*
Years	Team	Apps	(Gls)
1997–1999	Leicester City	0	(0)
1999	→Torquay United (loan)	7	(0)
1999–2001	Torquay United	20	(1)
- * Club domestic league appearances and goals

Gary Derek Campbell Neil (born 16 August 1978) is a Scottish former professional footballer. He was born in Glasgow and played professionally for Torquay United.

Neil, a utility player, began his career as an apprentice at Leicester City, turning professional in August 1997. He failed to make the first team at Leicester and joined Torquay United on loan on 25 March 1999, transfer deadline day and the same day on which Lee Russell also joined the Gulls. His league debut came on 27 March 1999, playing at left-back in a 3-0 at home to Hartlepool United, fellow debutant Eifion Williams scoring all three of Torquay's goals. At the end of the 1998-99 season, Neil was released by Leicester, joining Torquay on a free transfer that August, when he signed a one-year contract. Neil struggled to establish himself at Torquay, hindered by a series of injuries. His first goal came from the penalty spot on 24 February 2001 in a 2-2-1 defeat away to Halifax Town. After only 20 appearances in two years, it was little surprise that Neil was released by Torquay at the end of the 2000-01 season.

Currently, Gary is an independent personal trainer in the North-East of England, combining his experience of professional sports with many fitness and personal training qualifications. Gary trains several professional sportsmen including PGA golfer David Clark and local fitness hero Paul Wilson.
