= Stuart Wilson (footballer) =

English footballer and coach

Personal information
- Full name: Stuart Kevin Wilson
- Date of birth: 16 September 1977 (age 49)
- Place of birth: Leicester, England
- Position: Midfielder

Senior career*
Years	Team	Apps	(Gls)
1996–2000	Leicester City	22	(3)
2000	→ Sheffield United (loan)	6	(0)
2000–2001	Cambridge United	6	(0)
2001	Cambridge City		
2001	Anstey Nomads		
2001	Shepshed Dynamo		
2001–2004	Grantham Town		
2004–2005	Nuneaton Borough		
2005–2006	Coalville Town	29	(6)
2006–	Barrow Town		
- * Club domestic league appearances and goals

Stuart Wilson (born 16 September 1977) is an English former football midfielder and former coach of Long Eaton Ladies FC.
