= Gary Willard =

English football referee (1959–2024)

- Full name: Gary S Willard
- Born: 3 September 1959; Worthing, Sussex, England
- Died: 19 May 2024 (aged 64); Worthing
- Other occupation: Inland Revenue Officer

Domestic
Years	League	Role
1990–1994	Football League	Referee
1994–2000	Premier League	Referee

International
Years	League	Role
1996–1999	FIFA listed	Referee

Gary S. Willard (3 September 1959 – 20 May 2024) was an English football referee. He officiated in the Football League and the Premier League, and for FIFA. He came from Worthing in Sussex. He maintained an involvement in top-class football after retiring in 2000. His other occupation was as an officer for the Inland Revenue.

== Career ==
Willard became a referee for the Football League in 1990, and was promoted to the Premier League list of referees in 1994. He became a FIFA referee in 1996.

On 27 January 1998, he was referee for the Football League Cup semi-final first leg between Liverpool and Middlesbrough, which was a 2–1 home win. He also controlled the semi-final second leg the following year in the same competition, when Spurs won 1–0 at Wimbledon on 16 February 1999, for an aggregate win by that score.

On 28 March 1998, Willard was involved in a Premier League game at Oakwell Stadium between Barnsley and Liverpool - which finished 2–3. He sent off three players from the home side – Darren Barnard, Chris Morgan and Darren Sheridan – in the second half, causing play to be suspended for five minutes after Willard, having been chased by an interloper, was escorted off the pitch by stewards for his own protection until order was restored. He had to be given a police escort off the pitch after the game.

His final Premiership game was West Ham's 4–0 win over Middlesbrough at Upton Park on 16 May 1999, but he continued to referee for FIFA. The English referees' chief at the time, Philip Don, stated that Willard had not taken any Premier League appointments due to "personal reasons".

== Death ==
On 21 May 2024, it was announced that Willard had died, having had leukaemia.
