= Mike Riley (referee) =

English football referee

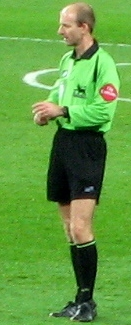
- Full name: Michael Anthony Riley
- Born: 17 December 1964 (age 61); Leeds, England
- Other occupation: Accountant

Domestic
Years	League	Role
1989–1994	Football League	Asst. referee
1994–1996	Football League	Referee
1996–2009	Premier League	Referee

International
Years	League	Role
1999–2009	FIFA listed	Referee

Michael Anthony Riley (born 17 December 1964) is an English former professional football referee, who has refereed matches in the English Football League, Premier League, and for FIFA. Riley was the general manager of the Professional Game Match Officials Limited between 2009 and 2023.

== Career ==
Riley was born in Leeds in West Yorkshire.

He became a national Football League referee in 1994, having previously served five years on their assistant referees' list. He was later granted FIFA status in 1999 allowing him to officiate international fixtures.

In 2002, Riley refereed the English FA Cup Final between Arsenal and Chelsea, which he later stated was "the highlight of my career".

Riley took charge of the 2004 Football League Cup Final, between Bolton and Middlesbrough, in a game that saw all three goals scored within the first 25 minutes. He awarded a penalty to Middlesbrough after seven minutes and cautioned five players during the course of the game. Riley failed to spot penalty taker, Zenden, kicking the ball twice.

Riley also headed England's refereeing team alongside assistants Philip Sharp and Glenn Turner at the UEFA Euro 2004 finals.

Riley refereed the controversial 2004 match between Manchester United and Arsenal, also known as the Battle of the Buffet, with the result ending Arsenal's record-breaking 49 match unbeaten run.

Riley officiated the Football League Championship playoff final between West Ham United and Preston North End in 2005. West Ham ran out 1–0 victors, seeing them promoted to the FA Premier League.

Riley was invited to go to Hong Kong to take charge of the 2006–07 Hong Kong FA Cup final between South China and Happy Valley in 2007. South China won by 3–1, allowing them to achieve a treble in local competitions (First Division League, Senior Shield and FA Cup). Riley gave three penalty kicks in the match, two for South China and one for Happy Valley.

Mike Riley was appointed manager of the Professional Game Match Officials Board (PGMOB) in June 2009, replacing Keith Hackett. This effectively ended his career in refereeing matches.

In June 2022 it was announced that he would be stepping down as the English refereeing chief effective from the end of the 2022/23 season.

In July 2023, it was reported that the Irish Football Association are close to appointing Riley as their new head of refereeing.

== Career statistics ==
Season	Games	Total (yellow card)	(yellow card) per game	Total (red card)	(red card) per game
1997–98	28	87	3.11	3	0.11
1998–99	23	81	3.52	7	0.30
1999–2000	28	93	3.32	9	0.32
2000–01	36	141	3.92	9	0.25
2001–02	31	117	3.77	19	0.61
2002–03	33	105	3.18	7	0.21
2003–04	38	130	3.42	6	0.16
2004–05	39	117	3.00	11	0.28
2005–06	42	147	3.50	16	0.31
2006–07	43	145	3.37	13	0.30
2007–08	37	124	3.35	6	0.16
2008–09	35	145	4.14	6	0.17
Overall	444	1432	3.23	109	0.25
There are no available records prior to 1997/1998.

Preceded by Graham Barber	FA Charity Shield referee 2000	Succeeded by Andy D'Urso
Preceded by Steve Dunn	FA Cup Final referee 2002	Succeeded by Graham Barber
Preceded by Paul Durkin	League Cup Final referee 2004	Succeeded by Steve Bennett
