= Graham Barber =

English football referee

- Full name: Graham Peter Barber
- Born: 5 June 1958 (age 68)

Domestic
| Years | League | Role |
| 1994–1996 | Football League | Referee |
| 1996–2004 | Premier League | Referee |

International
| Years | League | Role |
| 1998–2003 | FIFA | Referee |

Graham Peter Barber (born 5 June 1958) is an English former football referee. He was based in Tring in Hertfordshire during his career, but now lives in Spain.

== Career ==
In 1998, after progressing through to the FA Premier League List of referees via the Football League List, he was appointed to the FIFA International List.

He took charge of his first major appointment, the Charity Shield match between Arsenal and Manchester United at Wembley on 1 August 1999. The 'Gunners' were victorious by 2–1, thanks to second-half Kanu and Parlour goals, in reply to David Beckham's strike in the 36th minute.

Seventeen days later, on 18 August 1999, he was the man-in-the-middle for his first international game, the friendly match between Greece and El Salvador in Kavala, when Greece triumphed by 3 goals to 1.

His first major international engagement was the World Cup qualifying match on 3 September 2000, involving Hungary and Italy in Budapest, and this was drawn 2-2.

In the same month came his first UEFA Champions League game, Helsingborg versus Bayern Munich at the Olympia Stadium on 13 September - this ended in a 3–1 away win.

On 12 May 2002, he took charge of the Championship Play-off Final at the Millennium Stadium, Cardiff, between Birmingham City and Norwich City. Birmingham won by 4–2 on penalties, after extra time saw one goal each scored (by Geoff Horsfield and Iwan Roberts respectively) following a scoreless 90 minutes. He had also been referee for two earlier appointments in 2002 at semi-final level in the Football League One and Two Play-offs.

The first of his only two European Championship qualifying games, both in season 2002–03, was the encounter between Holland and Belarus on 7 September 2002 at the Philips Stadion in Eindhoven. It ended in a comprehensive 3–0 win for the Dutch.

His domestic career highlight was the 2003 FA Cup Final between Arsenal and Southampton at the Millennium Stadium on 17 May, when Robert Pires scored a 38th-minute goal to claim the trophy for Arsenal.

His last professional season was 2003–04. In this final period of his career he was given his last big European honour when he was chosen to referee the UEFA Super Cup game between AC Milan and FC Porto, held in the principality of Monaco at the Stade Louis II Stadium on 29 August 2003. Andriy Shevchenko scored the only goal to give Milan the win.

He was to handle one of the 2004 FA Cup Semi-finals before his retirement from active top-class officiating at the end of that season, the tie between Arsenal and Manchester United on 3 April 2004 at Villa Park, Birmingham. United won through thanks to a Paul Scholes goal in the 32nd minute.

He retired in 2004, two years before the standard FA Retirement age.

== Life after football ==
He subsequently moved to Spain, where he is CEO of Europa Networks.

| Preceded by Graham Poll | FA Charity Shield; 1999 | Succeeded by Mike Riley |
| Preceded by Mike Riley | FA Cup Final Referee; 2003 | Succeeded by Jeff Winter |
