= Paul Durkin =

English football referee (born 1955)

- Full name: Paul Anthony Durkin
- Born: 15 August 1955 (age 71); Isle of Portland, Dorset, England

Domestic
Years	League	Role
1987–2004	Football League	Referee
1992–2004	Premier League	Referee

International
Years	League	Role
1994–2000	FIFA	Referee

Paul Anthony Durkin (born 15 August 1955) is an English former football referee, who retired in 2004. He comes from the Isle of Portland in Dorset. He works as a referee assessor for the Football Association.

Durkin was England's only referee at the 1998 FIFA World Cup Finals in France, where he refereed one match – the Group B encounter between Italy and Austria. In the same year, he refereed the FA Cup Final between Arsenal and Newcastle United, he was in charge of the 2003 Football League Cup Final between Liverpool and Manchester United.

In 2004, Durkin appeared in ITV gameshow Simply the Best as the referee.

Preceded by Stephen Lodge	FA Cup Final Referee; 1998	Succeeded by Peter Jones
Preceded by Graham Poll	League Cup Final; 2003	Succeeded by Mike Riley
