= Alan Wilkie (referee) =

English football referee

- Full name: Alan B. Wilkie
- Born: 1951 (age 74–75); Denton Burn, Newcastle upon Tyne, England
- Other occupation: previously: Telecommunications electrical engineer now: Regional Refereeing Manager, The FA Vice Chairman at Chester-le-Street Town FC

Domestic
Years	League	Role
1981–1982	Northern League	Asst. referee
1982–1988	Northern League	Referee
1985–1988	Football League	Referee (supplementary)
1988–1993	Football League	Referee
1993–2000	Premier League	Referee

International
Years	League	Role
1987–1993	UEFA listed	Asst. referee
1993–2000	UEFA listed	Referee

Alan B. Wilkie (born 1951) is an English former football referee, who officiated in the Football League and the Premier League, and for UEFA. He was born in Denton Burn, Newcastle upon Tyne, but now lives in Chester-le-Street, County Durham. His other occupation during his refereeing career was as a Telecommunications electrical engineer, and he now works for the Football Association as a regional manager for referees in North East England.

== Career ==
Wilkie became a Class 3 referee in 1977, at the age of 26,^{†} when a serious knee injury meant him having to give up playing football in local leagues. In 1981^{†} he was selected as a linesman for the Northern League, and went on to referee in that league a year later. In 1984, he was appointed to the list of linesmen for the Football League, then became a supplementary referee for that league in 1985. He was further promoted to the full Football League list in 1988. His first match after this promotion was in the old Football League Third Division on 27 August 1988, the game between Mansfield Town and Northampton Town, which finished 1–1.^{†}

In September 1987 he had been given duties as linesman for a UEFA Cup match in Dundee, and in 1991 was selected to run the line for Keith Hackett in the European Cup semi-final first leg at the Stade Vélodrome between Marseille and Spartak Moscow. This finished 3–1, with Marseille progressing to the Final after the second leg. Wilkie would step up to handle his first European game as referee in the Anglo-Italian Cup tie between Ancona and Charlton in November 1993.^{†}

He was included in the list of Premier League referees towards the end of the 1992–93 season, handling his first game in that competition (and sending off his first Premiership player, the away side's Tony Cascarino) on 24 March 1993, when Leeds United drew 1–1 at home to Chelsea at Elland Road.

He was the referee during the match between Crystal Palace and Manchester United at Selhurst Park on 25 January 1995, when Eric Cantona of United performed a kung fu-style two-footed kick towards a group of spectators as he was leaving the field following his sending off for deliberately kicking Palace's Richard Shaw four minutes into the second half of the game. Wilkie at the time had no idea what had gone on, as he was talking to United's Andy Cole at the time: "It was only in the dressing room that one of the assistants told me what he (Cantona) had done."

At the end of that season, on 6 May 1995, Wilkie found it necessary to report the entire Norwich City team, including its substitutes, after a "mass protest" following the award of a penalty to Leeds United in the 80th minute of a match which would determine whether City were relegated from the Premier League or not. If successful, the spot kick would mean that a draw was likely, not enough for Norwich to stay up. In the event, Leeds scored a second goal on 90 minutes to send the 'Canaries' down. Wilkie was quoted in The Independent following the game. "All the Norwich team will be reported, I won't be isolating any one player," he said. "That would be impossible because they were all around me, even the reserve goalkeeper."

On 27 February 2000, Wilkie stepped out for what should have been the most prestigious domestic appointment of his career, the Football League Cup Final between Leicester City and Tranmere Rovers at Wembley. However, with just over an hour played, he suffered a calf muscle injury and had to be replaced by Phil Richards, the fourth official on that day. The match finished 2–1 to Leicester.

As well as being the first Premier League referee to handle 100 games in that competition, Wilkie took charge of 10 European games and a total of 456 League matches. He retired from refereeing in the year 2000 after his final Premiership match, the game between Manchester United and Spurs at Old Trafford on 6 May 2000, when the home side won 3–1.

== Retirement ==
In October 2003, he was part of a team conducting a "workshop for Senior Referees" in Port of Spain, Trinidad & Tobago, on behalf of CONCACAF (The Confederation of North, Central American and Caribbean Association Football), and in conjunction with the English FA.

== Life outside football ==
Wilkie is married to Margaret, and has two sons. He is self-admittedly a Newcastle United fan, and his other hobbies and interests include music, crosswords and driving. He worked for British Telecom as an electrical engineer for thirty years, combining that with refereeing, until taking up his present post with the FA.

In 2002, Wilkie published his autobiography, "One Night at the Palace: A Referee's Story", co-written with George Miller.
