= 1999–2000 Leicester City F.C. season =

1999–2000 season of Leicester City

Leicester City F.C.
1999–2000 season
- Chairman: Philip Smith
- Manager: Martin O'Neill
- Stadium: Filbert Street
- FA Premier League: 8th
- FA Cup: Fifth round
- League Cup: Winners
- Player of the Year: Gerry Taggart
- Top goalscorer: Tony Cottee (13)
- Highest home attendance: 22,170 vs Manchester United (18 March 2000, FA Premier League)
- Lowest home attendance: 12,157 vs Hereford United (22 December 1999, FA Cup)
- Average home league attendance: 19,825
Home colours	Away colours	Third colours

During the 1999–2000 English football season, Leicester City F.C. competed in the FA Premier League.

== Season summary ==
Leicester City achieved their highest league finish in 24 years by coming eighth in the final table, as well as reaching their third League Cup final in four years. They triumphed for the second time under Martin O'Neill and the third time in their history, beating Tranmere Rovers 2–1 at Wembley. O'Neill then left the club after accepting the offer to manage Celtic. In came former England under 21 coach Peter Taylor as his successor.

== Final league table ==
Pos	Team	Pld	W	D	L	GF	GA	GD	Pts	Qualification or relegation
6	Aston Villa	38	15	13	10	46	35	+11	58	Qualification for the Intertoto Cup third round
7	Sunderland	38	16	10	12	57	56	+1	58	
8	Leicester City	38	16	7	15	55	55	0	55	Qualification for the UEFA Cup first round (Note: Leicester City qualified for the UEFA Cup as League Cup winners.)
9	West Ham United	38	15	10	13	52	53	−1	55	
10	Tottenham Hotspur	38	15	8	15	57	49	+8	53	

Source: Premier League
Rules for classification: 1) points; 2) goal difference; 3) number of goals scored.
Notes:

Results summary

Overall								Home						Away					
Pld	W	D	L	GF	GA	GD	Pts	W	D	L	GF	GA	GD	W	D	L	GF	GA	GD
38	16	7	15	55	55	0	55	10	3	6	31	24	+7	6	4	9	24	31	−7

Source: 1999-2000 FA Premier League table

Results by round

Round	1	2	3	4	5	6	7	8	9	10	11	12	13	14	15	16	17	18	19	20	21	22	23	24	25	26	27	28	29	30	31	32	33	34	35	36	37	38
Ground	A	H	H	A	A	H	A	H	H	A	H	A	H	A	H	A	H	H	A	H	A	A	H	H	A	H	A	H	H	A	H	A	H	A	A	A	H	A
Result	L	W	D	L	W	W	L	D	W	W	W	L	W	L	W	W	L	L	L	L	D	D	L	W	D	W	L	L	W	L	D	W	L	D	W	W	W	L
Position	14	12	10	15	6	5	10	9	7	7	5	6	5	6	7	5	5	6	7	7	8	8	10	9	10	10	11	12	11	12	13	10	11	11	11	9	8	8

Source: 11v11.com: 1999-2000 Leicester City results
A = Away; H = Home; W = Win; D = Draw; L = Loss

== Results ==
Leicester City's score comes first

=== Legend ===
Win	Draw	Loss

=== Pre-season ===
19 July 1999	Bournemouth	2–3	Leicester City	Bournemouth
	Savage 17' (o.g.); Fletcher 32'		Gunnlaugsson 48'; Heskey 58'; Campbell 83'	Stadium: Dean Court

21 July 1999	Torquay United	2–1	Leicester City	Torquay
19:30 BST	Hill 4'; Healy (?)		Wilson 47'	Stadium: Plainmoor

27 July 1999	Lincoln City	2–7	Leicester City	Lincoln
	Gain (?); Smith (?)		Izzet (?); Heskey (?); Campbell (?); Marshall (?)	Stadium: Sincil Bank

27 July 1999	Crystal Palace	1–1	Leicester City	London
	Bradbury 42'		Cottee 55'	Stadium: Selhurst Park

1 August 1999	AEK Athens	3–2	Leicester City	Athens
			Zagorakis 6', 60' (pen.)	Stadium: Nikos Goumas Stadium; Referee: Georgios Psychomanis (Greece)

=== FA Premier League ===
7 August 1999 1	Arsenal	2–1	Leicester City	London
15:00 BST	Bergkamp 65'; Sinclair 90' (o.g.)		Cottee 57'	Stadium: Highbury; Attendance: 38,026; Referee: Alan Wilkie

11 August 1999 2	Leicester City	1–0	Coventry City	Leicester
19:45 BST	Izzet 24' (pen.)		Burrows (red card) 69'	Stadium: Filbert Street; Attendance: 19,196; Referee: Neale Barry

14 August 1999 3	Leicester City	2–2	Chelsea	Leicester
15:00 BST	Heskey 10'; Izzet 90' (pen.)		Wise 48'; Sinclair 90' (o.g.)	Stadium: Filbert Street; Attendance: 21,068; Referee: Stephen Lodge

21 August 1999 4	West Ham United	2–1	Leicester City	London
15:00 BST	Wanchope 29'; Di Canio 53'		Heskey 2'	Stadium: Upton Park; Attendance: 23,631; Referee: Alan Wiley

24 August 1999 5	Middlesbrough	0–3	Leicester City	Middlesbrough
19:45 BST			Heskey 35', 83'; Cottee 38'	Stadium: Riverside Stadium; Attendance: 33,126; Referee: Rob Harris

30 August 1999 6	Leicester City	1–0	Watford	Leicester
20:00 BST	Izzet 44'			Stadium: Filbert Street; Attendance: 17,920; Referee: Neale Barry

11 September 1999 7	Sunderland	2–0	Leicester City	Sunderland
15:00 BST	Butler 28'; McCann 82'		Taggart (yellow card) 57' (yellow-red card) 62'	Stadium: Stadium of Light; Attendance: 40,105; Referee: Andy D'Urso

18 September 1999 8	Leicester City	2–2	Liverpool	Leicester
15:00 BST	Cottee 2'; Sinclair (yellow card) (yellow-red card) 51'; Izzet 86'		Owen 23', 39'; Thompson (yellow card) (yellow-red card) 89'	Stadium: Filbert Street; Attendance: 21,623; Referee: Uriah Rennie

25 September 1999 9	Leicester City	3–1	Aston Villa	Leicester
15:00 BST	Izzet 40'; Southgate 48' (o.g.); Cottee 55'		Southgate (yellow card) (yellow-red card) 65'; Dublin 73'	Stadium: Filbert Street; Attendance: 19,917; Referee: Jeff Winter

3 October 1999 10	Tottenham Hotspur	2–3	Leicester City	London
16:00 BST	Iversen 26', 35'		Izzet 25' (pen.), 69'; Taggart 76'	Stadium: White Hart Lane; Attendance: 35,591; Referee: Graham Barber

16 October 1999 11	Leicester City	2–1	Southampton	Leicester
15:00 BST	Guppy 8'; Cottee 39'		Davies (red card) 76'; Pahars 84'	Stadium: Filbert Street; Attendance: 19,556; Referee: Barry Knight

23 October 1999 12	Bradford City	3–1	Leicester City	Bradford
15:00 BST	Blake 12'; Mills 40'; Redfearn 66'		Impey 21'	Stadium: Coral Windows Stadium; Attendance: 17,655; Referee: Mike Reed

30 October 1999 13	Leicester City	3–0	Sheffield Wednesday	Leicester
15:00 BST	Taggart 24', 36'; Cottee 57'			Stadium: Filbert Street; Attendance: 19,046; Referee: Paul Alcock

6 November 1999 14	Manchester United	2–0	Leicester City	Manchester
15:00 GMT	Cole 30', 83'			Stadium: Old Trafford; Attendance: 55,191; Referee: Paul Durkin

20 November 1999 15	Leicester City	2–1	Wimbledon	Leicester
15:00 GMT	Cottee 22', 58'		Gayle 21'	Stadium: Filbert Street; Attendance: 18,255; Referee: Paul Durkin

27 November 1999 16	Coventry City	0–1	Leicester City	Coventry
15:00 GMT			Heskey 60'	Stadium: Highfield Road; Attendance: 22,021; Referee: Stephen Lodge

4 December 1999 17	Leicester City	0–3	Arsenal	Leicester
11:30 GMT			Grimandi 23'; Guppy 53' (o.g.); Overmars 75'	Stadium: Filbert Street; Attendance: 20,495; Referee: Dermot Gallagher

18 December 1999 18	Leicester City	0–1	Derby County	Leicester
15:00 GMT			Powell 69'	Stadium: Filbert Street; Attendance: 18,581; Referee: David Elleray

26 December 1999 19	Leeds United	2–1	Leicester City	Leeds
15:00 GMT	Bridges 29'; Bowyer 45'		Cottee 10'	Stadium: Elland Road; Attendance: 40,105; Referee: Mark Halsey

28 December 1999 20	Leicester City	1–2	Newcastle United	Leicester
15:00 GMT	Zagorakis 83'		Ferguson 21'; Shearer 53'	Stadium: Filbert Street; Attendance: 21,225; Referee: Paul Durkin

3 January 2000 21	Everton	2–2	Leicester City	Liverpool
17:30 GMT	Hutchison 16'; Unsworth 56' (pen.)		Elliott 26', 31'	Stadium: Goodison Park; Attendance: 30,490; Referee: Jeff Winter

15 January 2000 22	Chelsea	1–1	Leicester City	London
15:00 GMT	Wise 85'		Taggart 41'	Stadium: Stamford Bridge; Attendance: 35,063; Referee: Graham Barber

22 January 2000 23	Leicester City	1–3	West Ham United	Leicester
15:00 GMT	Heskey 24'		Wanchope 13', 45'; Di Canio 60'	Stadium: Filbert Street; Attendance: 19,019; Referee: David Elleray

5 February 2000 24	Leicester City	2–1	Middlesbrough	Leicester
15:00 GMT	O'Neill 1' (o.g.); Schwarzer 41' (o.g.)		Campbell 52'	Stadium: Filbert Street; Attendance: 17,550; Referee: Steve Bennett

12 February 2000 25	Watford	1–1	Leicester City	Watford
15:00 GMT	Wooter 47'		Elliott 39'	Stadium: Vicarage Road; Attendance: 16,814; Referee: Andy D'Urso

5 March 2000 26	Leicester City	5–2	Sunderland	Leicester
16:00 GMT	Collymore 17', 60', 87'; Heskey 34'; Oakes 90'		Philips 53'; Quinn 75'	Stadium: Filbert Street; Attendance: 20,432; Referee: Neale Barry

11 March 2000 27	Wimbledon	2–1	Leicester City	London
15:00 GMT	Ardley 33'; Cort 87'		Taggart 55'	Stadium: Selhurst Park; Attendance: 14,319; Referee: Paul Alcock

18 March 2000 28	Leicester City	0–2	Manchester United	Leicester
15:00 GMT			Beckham 33'; Yorke 83'	Stadium: Filbert Street; Attendance: 22,170; Referee: Rob Harris

26 March 2000 29	Leicester City	2–1	Leeds United	Leicester
15:00 BST	Collymore 14'; Guppy 48'		Kewell 38'	Stadium: Filbert Street; Attendance: 21,095; Referee: Stephen Lodge

2 April 2000 30	Derby County	3–0	Leicester City	Derby
13:00 BST	Burley 15'; Sturridge 45'; Delap 45'		Lennon (yellow card) (yellow-red card) 67'	Stadium: Pride Park Stadium; Attendance: 25,763; Referee: Graham Poll

8 April 2000 31	Leicester City	1–1	Everton	Leicester
15:00 GMT	Taggart 8'		Hutchison 27'	Stadium: Filbert Street; Attendance: 18,705; Referee: Alan Wiley

15 April 2000 32	Newcastle United	0–2	Leicester City	Newcastle upon Tyne
15:00 BST			Cottee 7'; Savage 52'	Stadium: St James' Park; Attendance: 36,426; Referee: Uriah Rennie

19 April 2000 33	Leicester City	0–1	Tottenham Hotspur	Leicester
19:45 BST			Ginola 90'	Stadium: Filbert Street; Attendance: 19,764; Referee: Jeff Winter

22 April 2000 34	Aston Villa	2–2	Leicester City	Birmingham
15:00 BST	Thompson 31'; Merson 48'		Elliott 36'; Lennon 67'	Stadium: Villa Park; Attendance: 31,229; Referee: Graham Barber

29 April 2000 35	Southampton	1–2	Leicester City	Southampton
15:00 BST	Kachloul 4'; Richards (red card) 89'		Cottee 22'; Izzet 60'	Stadium: The Dell; Attendance: 15,178; Referee: Mike Reed

3 May 2000 36	Liverpool	0–2	Leicester City	Liverpool
19:45 BST			Cottee 2'; Gilchrist 48'	Stadium: Anfield; Attendance: 43,456; Referee: Graham Poll

6 May 2000 37	Leicester City	3–0	Bradford City	Leicester
15:00 BST	Elliott 59', 63'; Cottee 68'			Stadium: Filbert Street; Attendance: 21,103; Referee: Steve Dunn

14 May 2000 38	Sheffield Wednesday	4–0	Leicester City	Sheffield
16:00 BST	Quinn 14'; Booth 40'; Alexandersson 49'; De Bilde 61'			Stadium: Hillsborough; Attendance: 21,656; Referee: David Elleray

=== FA Cup ===
11 December 1999 R3	Hereford United	0–0	Leicester City	Hereford
13:00 GMT				Stadium: Edgar Street; Attendance: 7,795; Referee: Mike Dean

22 December 1999 R3 Replay	Leicester City	2–1 (a.e.t.)	Hereford United	Leicester
19:45 GMT	Elliott 78'; Izzet 104'		Fewings 40'	Stadium: Filbert Street; Attendance: 12,157; Referee: Rob Styles

9 January 2000 R4	Arsenal	0–0	Leicester City	London
16:00 GMT			Eadie (yellow card) (yellow-red card) 81'	Stadium: Highbury; Attendance: 35,710; Referee: Mike Riley

19 January 2000 R4 Replay	Leicester City	0–0 (6–5 p)	Arsenal	Leicester
19:45 GMT				Stadium: Filbert Street; Attendance: 15,235; Referee: Mike Riley
	Penalties
	Gunnlaugsson (penalty scored); Savage (penalty scored); Fenton (penalty scored); Elliott (penalty scored); Oakes (penalty missed); Campbell (penalty scored); Heskey (penalty scored)		(penalty scored) Šuker; (penalty missed) Dixon; (penalty scored) Hughes; (penalty scored) Parlour; (penalty scored) Henry; (penalty scored) Vieira; (penalty missed) Grimandi

30 January 2000 R5	Chelsea	2–1	Leicester City	London
16:00 GMT	Poyet 35'; Weah 48'; Wise (yellow card) (yellow-red card) 90'		Walsh (yellow card) (yellow-red card) 60'; Elliott 90+4'	Stadium: Stamford Bridge; Attendance: 30,141; Referee: Graham Poll

=== League Cup ===
14 September 1999 R2 1st leg	Crystal Palace	3–3	Leicester City	London
19:45 GMT	Morrison 23'; Zhiyi 71'; Mullins 74'		Digby 17' (o.g.); Lennon 34'; Taggart 58'	Stadium: Selhurst Park; Attendance: 5,006; Referee: David Elleray

22 September 1999 R2 2nd leg	Leicester City	4–2 (7–5 agg.)	Crystal Palace	Leicester
19:45 GMT	Oakes 19' (pen.), 88'; Marshall 53'; Fenton 79'		Thomson 61'; Bradbury 86'	Stadium: Filbert Street; Attendance: 12,762; Referee: Graham Poll

13 October 1999 R3	Leicester City	2–0	Grimsby Town	Leicester
19:45 GMT	Izzet 28'; Heskey 58'			Stadium: Filbert Street; Attendance: 13,701; Referee: Paul Taylor

15 December 1999 R4	Leicester City	0–0 (a.e.t.) (4–2 p)	Leeds United	Leicester
19:45 GMT			Radebe (yellow card) (yellow-red card) 90'	Stadium: Filbert Street; Attendance: 16,125; Referee: Graham Barber
	Penalties
	Gunnlaugsson (penalty scored); Elliott (penalty scored); Impey (penalty scored); Zagorakis (penalty missed); Izzet (penalty scored)		(penalty scored) Woodgate; (penalty scored) Harte; (penalty missed) Kelly; (penalty missed) Bowyer

12 January 2000 R5	Leicester City	3–3 (a.e.t.) (3–0 p)	Fulham	Leicester
19:45 GMT	Marshall 85', 111'; Walsh 87'		Peschisolido 58'; Horsfield 75'; Coleman 90+2'	Stadium: Filbert Street; Attendance: 13,576; Referee: Mike Reed
	Penalties
	Gunnlaugsson (penalty scored); Savage (penalty scored); Fenton (penalty scored)		(penalty missed) Coleman; (penalty missed) Trollope; (penalty missed) Horsfield

25 January 2000 SF 1st leg	Aston Villa	0–0	Leicester City	Birmingham
19:45 GMT				Stadium: Villa Park; Attendance: 28,037; Referee: Terry Heilbron

2 February 2000 SF 2nd leg	Leicester City	1–0 (1–0 agg.)	Aston Villa	Leicester
19:45 GMT	Elliott 45'			Stadium: Filbert Street; Attendance: 21,843; Referee: Paul Durkin

27 February 2000 F	Leicester City	2–1	Tranmere Rovers	London
15:00 GMT	Elliott 29', 81'		Hill (yellow card) 9' (yellow-red card) 63'; Kelly 77'	Stadium: Wembley Stadium; Attendance: 74,313; Referee: Alan Wilkie

== Squad ==
Note: Flags indicate national team as defined under FIFA eligibility rules; some limited exceptions apply. Players may hold more than one non-FIFA nationality.

No.	Pos.	Nation	Player
1	GK	ENG	Tim Flowers
3	DF	JAM	Frank Sinclair
4	DF	NIR	Gerry Taggart
5	DF	ENG	Steve Walsh
6	MF	TUR	Muzzy Izzet
7	MF	NIR	Neil Lennon
8	FW	ENG	Stan Collymore
10	FW	ENG	Darren Eadie
11	MF	ENG	Steve Guppy
13	FW	ISL	Arnar Gunnlaugsson
14	MF	WAL	Robbie Savage
15	DF	ENG	Phil Gilchrist
16	MF	SCO	Stuart Campbell
18	DF	SCO	Matt Elliott (captain)
19	DF	ENG	Robert Ullathorne

No.	Pos.	Nation	Player
20	FW	ENG	Ian Marshall
21	MF	ENG	Graham Fenton
22	GK	GLP	Pegguy Arphexad
24	DF	ENG	Andrew Impey
25	MF	ENG	Stuart Wilson
27	FW	ENG	Tony Cottee
28	FW	ENG	Lawrie Dudfield
29	MF	ENG	Stefan Oakes
30	GK	ENG	Michael Price
32	GK	ENG	John Hodges
34	MF	ENG	Danny Thomas
37	MF	GRE	Theodoros Zagorakis
38	DF	ENG	Tommy Goodwin
45	MF	NIR	Tim McCann
46	DF	ENG	Jordan Stewart

=== Left club during season ===
Note: Flags indicate national team as defined under FIFA eligibility rules; some limited exceptions apply. Players may hold more than one non-FIFA nationality.

No.	Pos.	Nation	Player
9	FW	ENG	Emile Heskey (to Liverpool)
16	MF	SCO	Stuart Campbell (on loan to Birmingham City)

No.	Pos.	Nation	Player
34	GK	NIR	Alan Fettis (on loan from Blackburn Rovers)
8	MF	ENG	Scott Taylor (to Wolverhampton Wanderers)

=== Reserve squad ===
Note: Flags indicate national team as defined under FIFA eligibility rules; some limited exceptions apply. Players may hold more than one non-FIFA nationality.

No.	Pos.	Nation	Player
12	DF	ENG	Guy Branston
17	FW	ARG	Fernando Pasquinelli
23	MF	ENG	Matt Piper

No.	Pos.	Nation	Player
31	GK	ENG	Matthew Nurse
33	MF	ENG	Alex Mortimer
35	DF	ENG	Carl Bacon

== Statistics ==
Players with squad numbers struck through and marked † left the club during the playing season.
Players with names in italics and marked * were on loan from another club for the whole of their season with Leicester.

=== Appearances, goals and cards ===
(Starting appearances + substitute appearances)

No.	Pos.	Name	League		FA Cup		League Cup		Total		Discipline	
No.	Pos.	Name	Apps	Goals	Apps	Goals	Apps	Goals	Apps	Goals	Yellow card	Red card
1	GK	(England) Tim Flowers	29	0	2	0	5+1	0	36+1	0	1	0
3	DF	(Jamaica) Frank Sinclair	34	0	3	0	7	0	44	0	9	1
4	DF	(Northern Ireland) Gerry Taggart	30+1	6	5	0	7+1	1	42+2	7	7	1
5	DF	(England) Steve Walsh	5+6	0	3+1	0	2+1	1	10+8	1	3	1
6	MF	(Turkey) Muzzy Izzet	32	8	2	1	6	1	40	10	4	0
7	MF	(Northern Ireland) Neil Lennon	31	1	2	0	6	1	39	2	8	1
8	FW	(England) Stan Collymore	6	4	0	0	0	0	6	4	1	0
~~9~~†	FW	(England) Emile Heskey	23	7	4	0	8	1	35	8	8	0
10	FW	(England) Darren Eadie	15+1	0	3	0	0	0	18+1	0	1	1
11	MF	(England) Steve Guppy	29+1	2	2	0	5	0	36+1	2	2	0
13	FW	(Iceland) Arnar Gunnlaugsson	2	0	2+1	0	0+2	0	4+3	0	0	0
14	MF	(Wales) Robbie Savage	35	1	5	0	7	0	47	1	6	0
15	DF	(England) Phil Gilchrist	17+10	1	3	0	5+1	0	25+11	1	1	0
16	MF	(Scotland) Stuart Campbell	1+3	0	0+3	0	0+2	0	1+8	0	0	0
18	DF	(Scotland) Matt Elliott	37	6	5	2	6	3	48	11	3	0
20	FW	(England) Ian Marshall	2+19	0	0+1	0	3+1	3	5+21	3	1	0
21	FW	(England) Graham Fenton	1+1	0	0+3	0	0+4	1	1+8	1	1	0
22	GK	(France) Pegguy Arphexad	9+2	0	3+1	0	3	0	15+3	0	0	0
24	MF	(England) Andrew Impey	28+1	1	2+1	0	5+2	0	35+4	1	0	0
25	MF	(England) Stuart Wilson	0	0	0	0	0+2	0	0+2	0	0	0
27	FW	(England) Tony Cottee	30+3	13	2	0	3	0	35+3	13	1	0
28	FW	(England) Lawrie Dudfield	0+2	0	0	0	0	0	0+2	0	0	0
29	MF	(England) Stefan Oakes	15+7	1	3	0	7	2	25+7	3	1	0
34	DF	(England) Danny Thomas	0+3	0	0	0	0	0	0+3	0	0	0
37	MF	(Greece) Theodoros Zagorakis	6+11	1	4	0	3+4	0	13+15	1	2	0
38	DF	(England) Tommy Goodwin	1	0	0	0	0	0	1	0	0	0
46	DF	(England) Jordan Stewart	0+1	0	0+1	0	0	0	0+2	0	0	0

== Transfers ==
=== In ===
Date	Pos	Name	From	Fee	Notes
30 July 1999	GK	(England) Tim Flowers	Blackburn Rovers	£2,100,000	
10 August 1999	DF	(England) Phil Gilchrist	Oxford United	£500,000	
10 December 1999	MF	(England) Darren Eadie	Norwich City	£3,200,000	
10 February 2000	FW	(England) Stan Collymore	Aston Villa	Free	
23 March 2000	FW	(Argentina) Fernando Pasquinelli	Boca Juniors	Loan	

=== Out ===
Date	Pos	Name	To	Fee	Notes
27 July 1999	GK	(United States) Kasey Keller	Rayo Vallecano	Free	
8 October 1999	MF	(England) Scott Taylor	Wolverhampton Wanderers	Free	
18 November 1999	DF	(England) Guy Branston	Rotherham United	£500,000	
10 March 2000	FW	(England) Emile Heskey	Liverpool	£11,200,000	

Transfers in: ▼£5,800,000
Transfers out: ▲£11,700,000
Total spending: ▲£6,450,000
