= Thomas Goodwin (disambiguation) =

Thomas Goodwin (1600–1680) was an English Puritan theologian.

Thomas Goodwin may also refer to:

== Government and politics ==
- Thomas Goodwin (Australian politician) (1848–1921), New South Wales politician
- Thomas Goodwin (MP) (died 1566), MP for Poole and Lyme Regis (UK Parliament constituency)
- John Goodwin (British Army officer) (Thomas Herbert John Chapman Goodwin, 1871–1960), governor of Queensland
- Tom Goodwin (New Jersey politician) (born c. 1951), state senator

== Other people ==
- Tom Goodwin (born 1968), American professional baseball coach and former player
- Thomas Goodwin (Archdeacon of Derby) (c. 1660–1719), English Anglican priest
- Tommy Goodwin (footballer) (born 1979), English footballer
- Thomas C. Goodwin, documentary filmmaker, producer of Educating Peter

== See also ==
- Thomas Goodwin Hatchard, bishop of Mauritius
- Thomas Godwin (disambiguation)
