= Great Barrington, Gloucestershire =

Village in Gloucestershire, England

Great Barrington
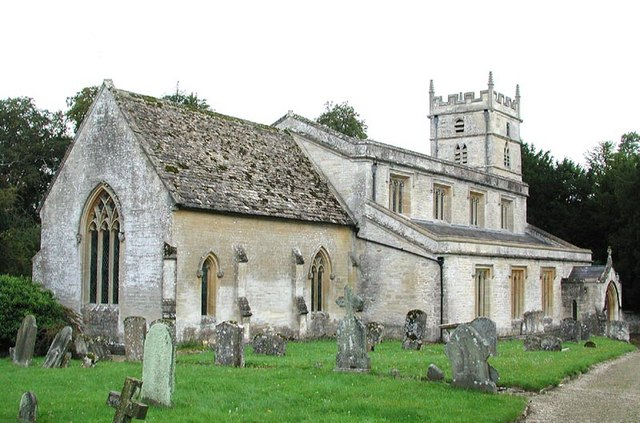
- St. Mary's Church, Great Barrington

- Location within Gloucestershire
- Civil parish: Barrington
- District: Cotswold
- Shire county: Gloucestershire
- Region: South West
- Country: England
- Sovereign state: United Kingdom
- Post town: Burford
- Postcode district: OX18
- Police: Gloucestershire
- Fire: Gloucestershire
- Ambulance: South Western
- UK Parliament: North Cotswolds

Great Barrington is a village and former civil parish, now in the parish of Barrington, in the Cotswold district of Gloucestershire, England. It lies in the north bank of the River Windrush, 3 miles (4.8 km) west of the town of Burford, Oxfordshire. In 1931 the parish had a population of 330.

== History ==
The toponym is recorded in the Domesday Book as Bernintone. It is derived from a man named Beorn, and so means "settlement of or connected with Beorn".

In the middle ages the manor and village of Great Barrington was held by Llanthony Priory, which retained it until the Dissolution. From 1553 to 1735 the manor was held by the Bray family. In 1720 Edmund Bray (1686–1725) inherited the estate from his older brother William Bray (MP) (1682–1720). Edmund Bray's son Reginald sold the estate in 1734 to Charles Talbot, 1st Baron Talbot, the Lord Chancellor, for the use of his son William Talbot, also later 1st Baron Dynevor, and William's wife, Mary de Cardonnel.

Between 1736 and 1738 Charles Talbot built Barrington Park, a country house in the Palladian style, now a Grade I listed building. William's daughter Cecil de Cardonnel, 2nd Baroness Dynevor, who married George Rice inherited the newly rebuilt Barrington Park. The house and estate has remained in the hands of Charles Talbot's descendants (since 1869 the Wingfield family) to the present day.

The village of Great Barrington, and Barrington Park itself, fell into increasing disrepair during the 1960s and 70s under the owner, Charles Wingfield. Following a planning application to the Cotswold District Council in 2011, the main house was completely restored by architects Inskip+Jenkins, including the two wings designed by John Macvicar Anderson in the 1880s.

The ancient parish of Great Barrington extended 3.5 miles (5.6 km) south-west of the village and included the western part of the village of Little Barrington. In 1866 the parish became a civil parish, but on 1 April 1935 the civil parish was abolished and merged with the parish of Little Barrington to form the civil parish of Barrington.

Despite its geographical position in Gloucestershire, part of the parish of Great Barrington formed an exclave of Berkshire until 1844.

== Church ==
St Mary's church in Great Barrington is a Grade II* listed building, built in the late 12th century and restored in 1880 by Francis Penrose. At the west end of the church there is a monument to Edmund Bray. There are numerous monuments in the chancel to the Talbot family, including a sculpture by Joseph Nollekens of Mary, Countess Talbot (d.1787), the estranged wife of Earl Talbot. Their great-grandson, George Rice-Trevor, 4th Baron Dynevor is also buried there.

== Famous people ==
- Thomas Wharton, 1st Marquess of Wharton, created a scandal in 1682 when, during a drunken rampage, he desecrated the church at Great Barrington. Although he became a leading figure in Government, he was never allowed to forget the episode.

== See also ==
- Great Barrington, Massachusetts
