= Robert Dell =

Robert Dell may refer to:

- Robert Dell (priest) (1922–2008), Archdeacon of Derby from 1973 to 1992
- Robert Dell (socialist), British journalist
- Robert Dell (engineer), American geothermal engineer, installation artist, energy expert and engineering professor
