= Talbot Dilworth-Harrison =

Talbot Dilworth-Harrison (5 July 1886 – 16 May 1975) was Archdeacon of Chesterfield from 1934 until 1943.

He was educated at Dean Close School, Keble College, Oxford and Ripon College Cuddesdon. He was a Lecturer at St Boniface Missionary College, Warminster from 1907 until 1908; Curate at StMary, Prestwich from 1909 to 1917; Vicar of Ringley from 1917 to 1927; and Vicar of St Bartholomew, Brighton before his time as Archdeacon and Vicar of Edingley afterwards.

== Notes ==
Church of England titles
Preceded by Geoffrey Hare Clayton	Archdeacon of Chesterfield; 1934 – 1963	Succeeded by Thomas Wood Ingram Cleasby
