= Christine Wilson (priest) =

British Church of England priest

The Reverend Christine Wilson
- Dean of Lincoln
- Church: Church of England
- Diocese: Diocese of Lincoln
- In office: 2016 to 2023
- Predecessor: Philip Buckler
- Other post: Archdeacon of Chesterfield (2010–2016)

Orders
- Ordination: 1997 (deacon); 1998 (priest)

Personal details
- Born: Christine Louise Bravery; 26 March 1958 (age 68)
- Denomination: Anglicanism

Christine Louise Wilson (née Bravery; born 26 March 1958) is a British retired Church of England priest. She served as Dean of Lincoln, 2016–2023 and as Archdeacon of Chesterfield from 2010 to 2016.

== Early life and education ==
Wilson was born Christine Louise Bravery on 26 March 1958 in Brighton, Sussex, England. She was educated at Margaret Hardy Secondary Modern, then an all-girls secondary school in Brighton. She trained for ordination on the Southern Dioceses Ministerial Training Scheme, completing a Diploma in Theology (DipTh) in 1994.

== Ordained ministry ==
Wilson was ordained in the Church of England as a deacon in 1997 and as a priest in 1998. From 1997 to 2002, she served her curacy at St Peter's Church, Henfield in the Diocese of Chichester. She was team vicar of Hove from 2002 until 2008; and then vicar of Goring-by-Sea until her appointment as archdeacon.

On 27 May 2016, Wilson was announced as the next Dean of Lincoln. She was installed on dean on 22 October 2016.

Wilson has been Senior Independent Director for Ecclesiastical Insurance since November 2017, having been on the board since 2012 when she was Archdeacon of Chesterfield. Commenting on her appointment, Wilson said "Ecclesiastical has enjoyed a long relationship with the Church of England and I am pleased to be able to continue this association." Ecclesiastical received criticism from three Church of England bishops in 2017 over its "horse trade" methods in settlements of clerical abuse cases.

=== Lincoln Cathedral ===
In April 2018, Wilson publicly apologised to victims and survivors of child sex abuse by a former deputy head teacher at Lincoln Cathedral School. She acknowledged that some of the survivors had waited nearly fifty years for justice. The case was triggered by a new diocesan safeguarding officer carrying out a review of historic cases, which led to police setting up Operation Redstone in 2015.

From April 2019 until March 2020 she took voluntary leave of absence from the cathedral.

At this time, the Canon Chancellor, Paul Overend, also agreed to step away from his post. The cathedral said at the time that this was for separate reasons, connected to one issue. It was later confirmed that police outside of Lincolnshire were investigating a historical safeguarding matter reported to the Diocese of Lincoln.

On 22 November 2019, Wilson issued a statement confirming that she is seeking legal action to bring an end to the "long running saga over her absence from the cathedral". She added that on Monday 18 November 2019, the President of Tribunals made a determination that a complainant and the bishop had not followed the proper process at the outset and therefore the complaint, which led to her absence, was void and invalid. The President of Tribunals stated that this was "unfortunate" and the complainant may wish to issue another complaint. Wilson added that she had over the last seven months respected the processes of the church throughout the inquiry and cooperated fully.

Wilson retired effective 31 March 2023.

Church of England titles
Preceded by David Garnett	Archdeacon of Chesterfield; 2010–2016	Succeeded by Carol Coslett
Preceded by Philip Buckler	Dean of Lincoln; 2016–2023	Succeeded by Simon Jones
