= Gerald Phizackerley =

English Anglican clergyman

The Ven. Gerald Phizackerley
Personal information
- Born: 3 October 1929 (age 95)

The Ven. Gerald Robert Phizackerley (born 3 October 1929) is an English Anglican clergyman who was Archdeacon of Chesterfield from 1978 until 1996.

== Biography ==
Phizackerley was educated at Queen Elizabeth Grammar School, Penrith, University College, Oxford and Wells Theological College and ordained in 1955. After a curacy at St Barnabas, Carlisle he was Chaplain of Abingdon School from 1957 to 1963. He was Rector of Gaywood from 1964 to 1978; and Rural Dean of Lynn from 1968 to 1978 before his time as Archdeacon and Priest in charge of Ashford-in-the-Water afterwards.

== Notes ==
Church of England titles
Preceded by Thomas Wood Ingram Cleasby	Archdeacon of Chesterfield; 1978 – 1996	Succeeded by David Christopher Garnett
