= Henry Freer =

Thomas Henry Freer
- Born: 1831; Birmingham
- Died: 26 June 1904 (aged 72–73)
- Occupation: Archdeacon of Derby

Thomas Henry Freer (1833–1904) was Archdeacon of Derby from 1891 to 1904.

Born in Birmingham, he was educated at King Edward's School, Birmingham and Trinity College, Cambridge. He was ordained deacon in 1861 and priest in 1863. He was a teacher at Wellington College from 1861 to 1875; Rector of Sudbury from 1877 and Canon of Southwell from 1890.

He died on 26 June 1904.

== Notes ==
Church of England titles
Preceded by Edward Balston	Archdeacon of Derby; 1891–1904	Succeeded by Edward Ash Were
