= Henry FitzHerbert =

Henry FitzHerbert may refer to:

- Henry FitzHerbert (priest) (1882–1958), Archdeacon of Derby
- Henry FitzHerbert, 3rd Baronet of the Fitzherbert baronets
- Henry Samuel Fitzherbert (1851–1912), Member of Parliament in Wellington, New Zealand

== See also ==
- Henry FitzHerbert Wright (1870–1947), English cricketer, lawyer and Conservative politician
