= Church of St Peter, Little Barrington =

Coordinates: 51.8131°N 1.6984°W

Church of St Peter
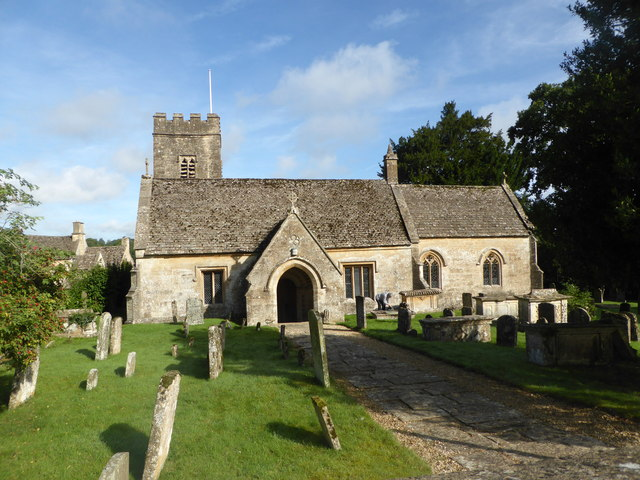

- Denomination: Church of England

Architecture
- Heritage designation: Grade I listed building
- Designated: 26 January 1961

Administration
- Province: Canterbury
- Diocese: Gloucester
- Parish: Barrington

The Anglican Church of St Peter at Little Barrington in the civil parish of Barrington in the Cotswold District of Gloucestershire, England was built in the late 12th century. It is a grade I listed building.

== History ==
The church was built in the late 12th century. The nave was largely rebuilt in the 14th and there was further restoration in the 15th century. The church was a dependent chapel of the church in Great Barrington and both became the property of Llanthony Priory.

The gallery at the west end of the nave was removed in 1920.

The parish is part of the Windrush benefice within the Diocese of Gloucester.

== Architecture ==
The limestone building has a stone slate roof. It consists of the nave, with a wagon roof and supported by diagonal buttresses, south porch, north asile and chancel There is a three-stage west tower. The oldest of the bells in the tower is from1638. There is a sanctus bellcote above the chancel arch.

The Norman south doorway has 3 levels of chevron and dogtooth carvings. This was dismantled cleaned and reassembled in 1865. The tympaneum which is now displayed in the north wall has a relief of Christ flanked by winged angels.

A large memorial to the Tayler family takes up much of the interior of the east wall. It consists of an inscribed plaque with carved figures on either side.

There are several other memorials within the church. In the nave are wall paintings from 1736.

The font is from the 15th century.
