= Edmund Outram =

English Anglican priest

Edmund Outram (15 September 1765 – 7 February 1821) was Archdeacon of Derby from 1809 until his death.

Outram was educated at Manchester Grammar School and St John's College, Cambridge. He received the degree of Doctor of Divinity (DD). He held incumbencies at St Andrew, Wootton Rivers, Wiltshire and St Philip, Birmingham before becoming a Canon Residentiary at Lichfield Cathedral.

His grave in Birmingham Cathedral is by William Hollins.

== Notes ==
Church of England titles
Preceded by James Falconer	Archdeacon of Derby; 1809–1821	Succeeded by Samuel Butler
