= Carol Coslett =

British Anglican priest

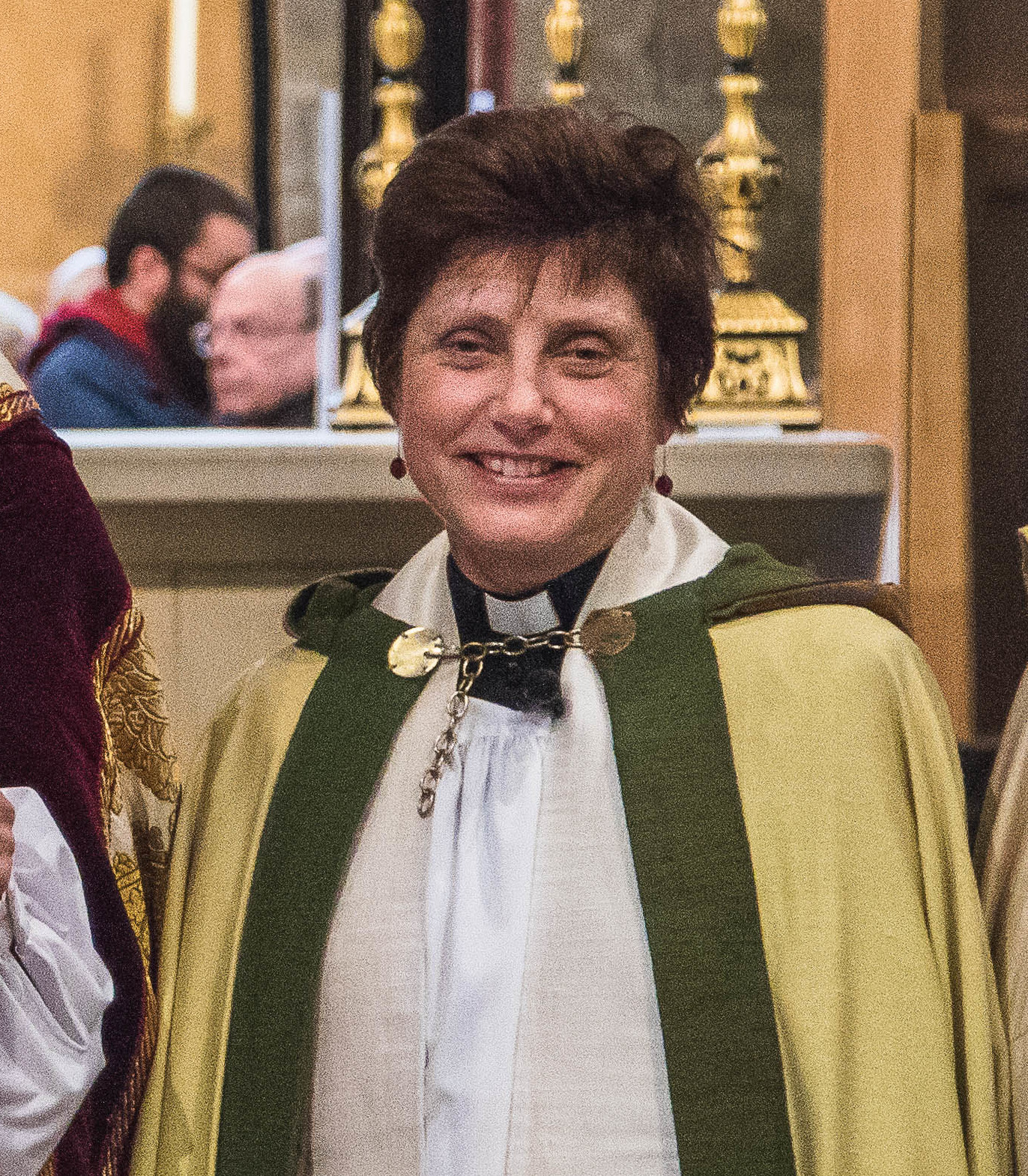
Coslett in March 2018

Carol Ann Coslett (born 18 August 1963) is a British Anglican priest. From 2018 until 2023, she served as an archdeacon in the Church of England's Diocese of Derby: as Archdeacon of Chesterfield until 2022, then as Archdeacon of Derbyshire Peak and Dales.

Coslett was educated at Bangor University and Ripon College Cuddesdon. After a curacy in Horsell she was Rector of Betchworth until her appointment as archdeacon.

Coslett resigned her archdeaconry during February 2023.

Church of England titles
Preceded by Christine Wilson	Archdeacon of Chesterfield; 2018–2022	Succeeded by herself as Archdeacon of Derbyshire Peak and Dales
Preceded by herself as Archdeacon of Chesterfield	Archdeacon of Derbyshire Peak and Dales; 2022–2023	TBA
