= Richard Strete =

Anglican priest

The Venerable Richard Strete was an Anglican priest in England during the 16th century.

Strete was educated at the University of Oxford. He was a Canon of Lichfield from 1521 to 1527; Archdeacon of Shropshire 1527 until 1536, and of Derby from 1533 until his death on 7 January 1543.
