= John Ramridge =

English priest

John Ramridge was an English priest in the 16th Century.

Ramridge was educated at Merton College, Oxford. He held livings at Garsington, Coventry and Husbands Bosworth. He was Dean of Lichfield from 1554 to 1558 and Archdeacon of Derby from 1558 until his deprivation in 1559.
