= Edmund Bray =

English politician (1686–1725)

Edmund Bray (1686–1725) of Barrington Park, Gloucestershire was a British politician who sat in the English House of Commons from 1701 to 1707 and the British House of Commons from 1707 to 1708 and from 1720 to 1722.

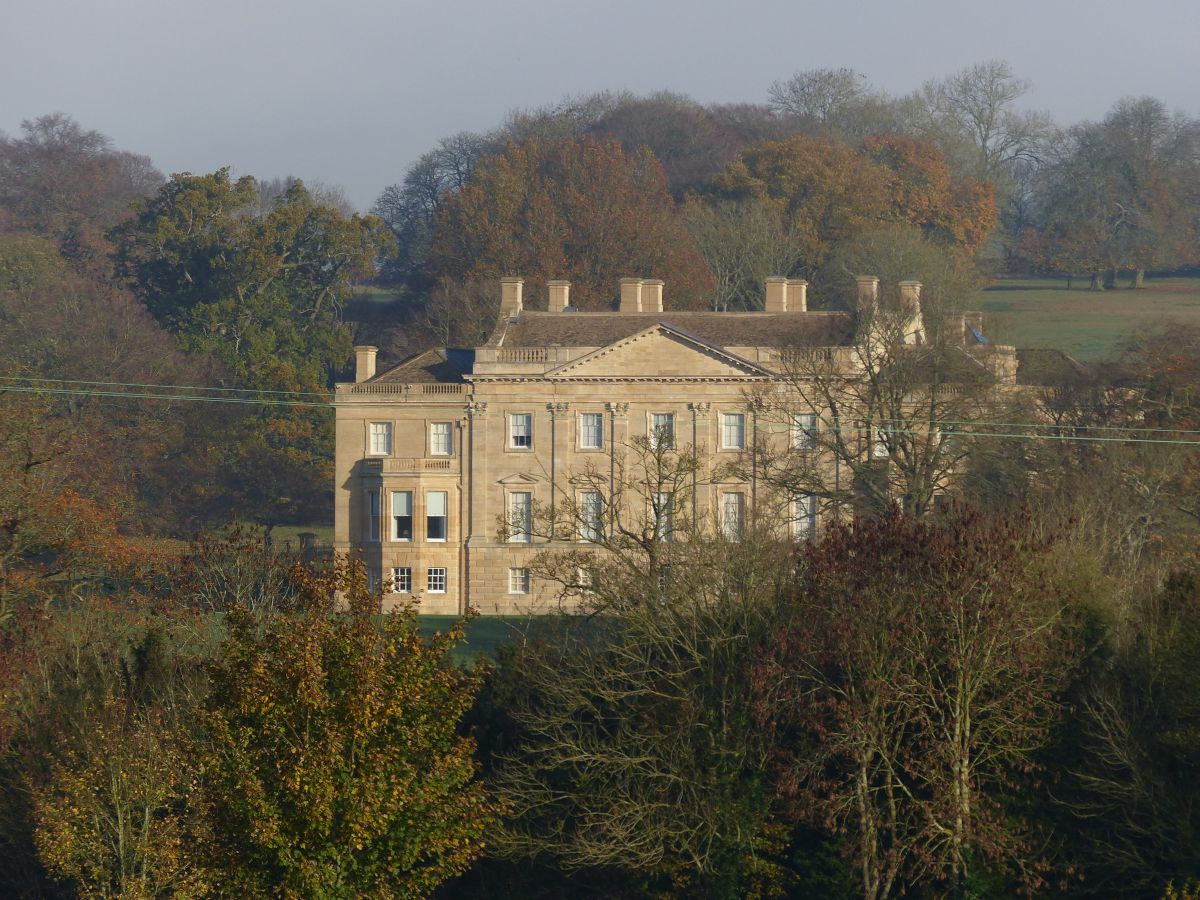
Barrington Park house as rebuilt in 1737

Bray was a younger son of Reginald Bray (d. 1688) of Barrington Park and his wife Jane Rainton, daughter of William Rainton of Shilton, Shilton, Oxfordshire, who had a large family of 6 sons and 9 daughters. He married, on 16 December 1697, Frances Morgan, the daughter and heiress of Sir Edward Morgan, 3rd Baronet (d. 1682) of Llantarnam Abbey, Monmouthshire.

Bray was returned as a Whig Member of Parliament for Tewkesbury in the January 1701 election and retained his seat in the second general election of 1701. He was wholly inactive in the House, however, and was granted leave of absence several times over long periods. He was threatened with a challenge at Tewkesbury at the election of 1702, but successfully repelled it. He was returned unopposed again in the 1705 general election, but decided not to stand for re-election at Tewkesbury in 1708. He stood for Cirencester in 1713 but came fourth place in the poll.

In 1720 he succeeded his remaining elder brother William to the Great Barrington estate. Bray was returned as MP for Gloucestershire at a by-election on 22 June 1720 but did not stand at the subsequent general election of 1722.

Bray died on 6 September 1725 and was buried at Great Barrington. Shortly before his death he erected a monument at Great Barrington to commemorate a son and daughter who had died young, which also provided details of his wider family. He was succeeded by his eldest son Reginald Morgan Bray, who sold Barrington Park in 1734 to Charles Talbot, 1st Baron Talbot, the Lord Chancellor, for the use of his son William Talbot and William's wife, Mary de Cardonnel.

Parliament of England
Preceded by Richard Dowdeswell; Charles Hancock	Member of Parliament for Tewkesbury; 1701–1708; With: Richard Dowdeswell	Succeeded by Richard Dowdeswell; Henry Ireton
Parliament of Great Britain
Preceded by Hon. Henry Berkeley; Matthew Ducie Moreton	Member of Parliament for Gloucestershire; 1720–1722; With: Hon. Henry Berkeley	Succeeded by Hon. Henry Berkeley; Kinard de la Bere
