= Edward Noakes =

The Ven. Edward Spencer Noakes (23 May 1861 – 30 December 1944) was Archdeacon of Derby from 1909 to 1943.

He was born at Brede in 1861, educated at St Catharine's College, Cambridge and ordained deacon in 1889 and priest in 1891. His first post was at St Andrew the Less, Cambridge. He was a teacher at The Perse School, Cambridge then Head teacher at Magnus Grammar School. He was Vicar of Edale from 1905 to 1908 (and Rural Dean of Eyam from 1907 to 1908); Vicar of St John's, Derby from 1908 to 1914; and Vicar of St Matthew, Darley Abbey from 1914 to 1930.

He died on 30 December 1944, aged 83.

== Notes ==
Church of England titles
Preceded by Edward Ash Were	Archdeacon of Derby; 1909–1943	Succeeded by Henry Edward FitzHerbert
