= Ian Gatford =

English Anglican archdeacon (1940–2026)

The Ven. Ian Gatford AKC (15 June 1940 – 18 July 2026) was an English Anglican prelate who was Archdeacon of Derby from 1993 until 2005.

After several years with Taylor Woodrow, he studied at King's College London and its postgraduate facility at St Boniface College, Warminster. He was ordained deacon in 1967 and priest in 1968. He was successively: curate at St Mary, Clifton, Nottingham; team vicar at Holy Trinity in the same neighbourhood; vicar of St Martin, Sherwood; and a Canon Residentiary at Derby Cathedral.

Gatford died on 18 July 2026, aged 86.

== Notes ==
Church of England titles
Preceded by Robert Dell	Archdeacon of Derby; 1993–2005	Succeeded by Christopher Cunliffe
