= Christopher Cunliffe =

Anglican priest

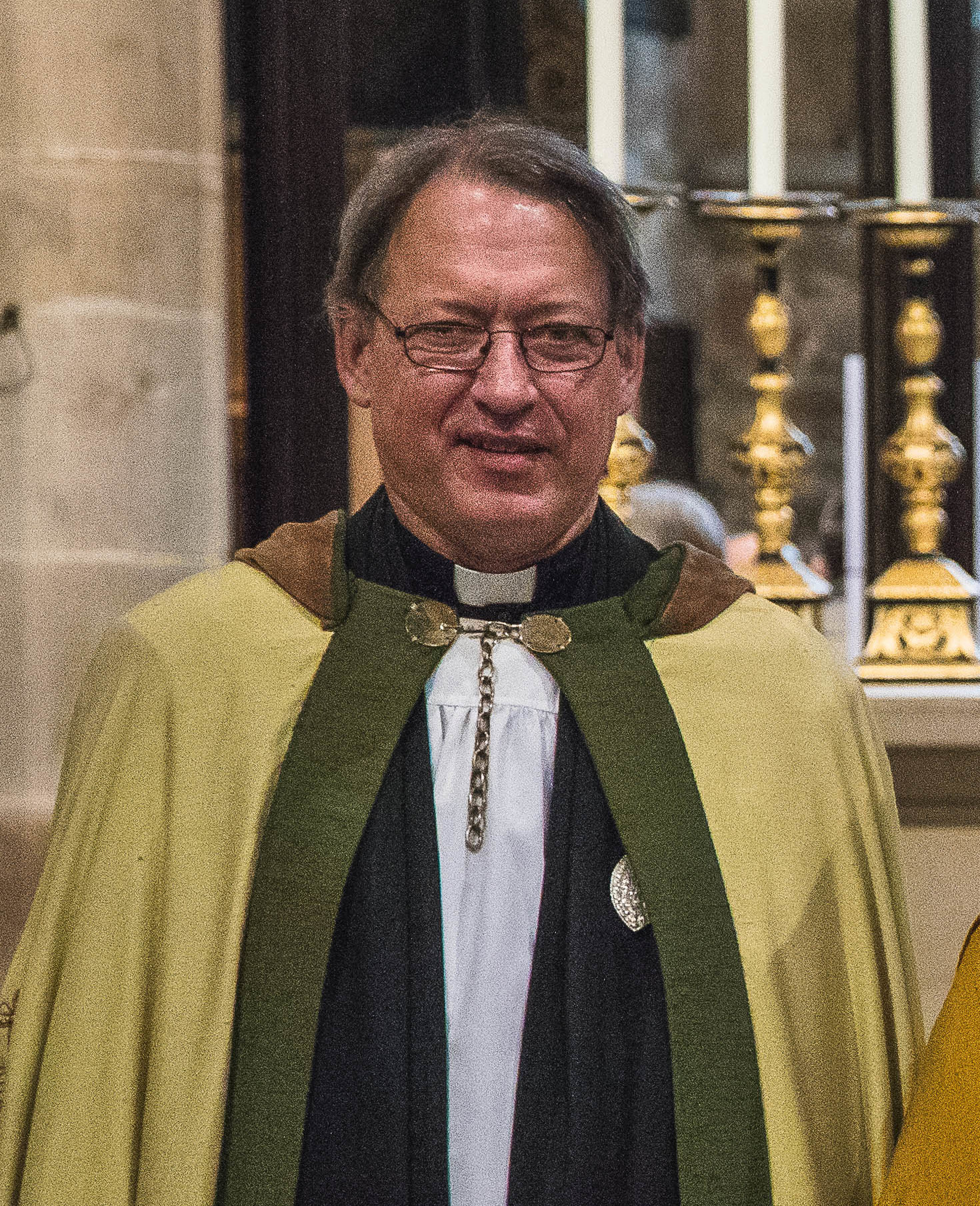
Cunliffe in March 2018

Christopher John Cunliffe (born 25 September 1955) is a retired Anglican priest who served as Archdeacon of Derby from his appointment in 2006 until his retirement, effective 31 December 2020.

He was educated at Charterhouse, Christ Church, Oxford, trained for the priesthood at Westcott House, Cambridge, and was ordained in 1983.

After a curacy in Chesterfield he was a Fellow at Lincoln College, Oxford then Chaplain of the City University London. He was Selection Secretary and Vocations Officer for the advisory board of Ministry from 1991 to 1996; the Bishop of London's Advisor for Ordained Ministry from 1997 to 2003, and Chaplain to the Bishop of Bradwell until his appointment as Archdeacon.

Church of England titles
Preceded by Ian Gatford	Archdeacon of Derby; 2006–2020	Matthew Trick
