= John Walton (priest) =

John Walton (c. 1546 - 1603) was an Anglican priest, who served as Archdeacon of Derby from 1590 until 1603.

Walton was born in Durham, and may have been the brother of Alderman Richard Walton (d. 1584). He matriculated as a pensioner at St John's College, Cambridge at Easter 1568, took his BA four years later, his MA in 1575 and BD in 1582.

He was appointed a Canon of Lichfield in 1567. He held a number of benefices, being Rector of Breadsall, Derbyshire (1577-1603), vicar of High Offley, Staffordshire (1580-1603) and rector of Gedling, Nottinghamshire (1590-1603). He was also archdeacon of Derby from 1590.

He died on 1 June 1603, leaving a widow Jane (d. 1605). They were both buried in All Saints, Derby. By his will Walton left money to be lent to poor tradesmen in Durham, for the purchase of silver cups by the corporation of Derby, as a contribution towards the purchase of the rectory of All Saints. His wife also left a number of substantial charitable bequests, including £100 to found a scholar ship at St John's College.
