= Henry Ryder (priest) =

British clergyman

The Venerable Henry Ryder, D.D. (died 1755) was an Anglican priest in England.

Ryder was educated at Emmanuel College, Cambridge. He was incorporated at Oxford in 1711. He held living at Grimley, Worcester, Hertingfordbury and Hertford. He was Archdeacon of Derby from 1719 until his death on 19 April 1755.
