= Samuel Clarke (Archdeacon of Derby) =

English priest (1582–1641)

Samuel Clarke or Clerke DD (1582–1641) was Church of England priest, who served as Archdeacon of Derby from 1617 until 1641. He was a close supporter of Archbishop Laud and opponent of Puritanism.

Clarke was born in Warwickshire and educated at Magdalen College, Oxford. He graduated MA in 1607, and in the following year Francis Morgan made him rector of St Peter's Church, Northampton. John Cooke (Cock, Cocke), a Fellow of St John's College, Cambridge in 1571, had been appointed there in 1607. Morgan, of Kingsthorpe, then successfully asserted his right as patron, over those of the executors of the previous rector, and brought in Clarke.
