= John Richardson (Archdeacon of Derby) =

The Ven. John Farquhar Richardson, MA (23 April 1905- 29 April 1991) was Archdeacon of Derby from 1952 to 1973; and an Honorary Chaplain to the Queen during the same period.

He was educated at Winchester and Trinity Hall, Cambridge and Westcott House, Cambridge. He was ordained deacon in 1929 and priest in 1930. His first post was as a Curate at Holy Trinity, Cambridge. He was Chaplain of Repton School from 1932 to 1935; Curate of St Martin-in-the-Fields from 1935 to 1936; Vicar of Christ Church, Hampstead from 1936 to 1941; and Rector of Bishopwearmouth from 1941 to 1952.

== Family ==
He was the son of William Henry Richardson and his wife Gertrude Mary Alice née Walker.
On the 18th of July 1936 he married Elizabeth Mary Dean in the Church of St. Mary the Great, Cambridge.
She was daughter of Dr. Henry Roy Dean, Master of Trinity Hall, Cambridge and his wife Irene née Wilson.

== Notes ==
Church of England titles
Preceded by Henry Edward FitzHerbert	Archdeacon of Derby; 1952–1973	Succeeded by Robert Sydney Dell
