= Thomas Godwyn =

Thomas Godwyn may refer to:

- Thomas Godwyn (scholar), English headmaster and scholar
- Thomas Godwyn (MP), English politician

== See also ==
- Thomas Godwin (disambiguation)
