= Thomas Godwin =

Thomas Godwin may refer to:

- Thomas Godwin (bishop) (1517–1590), English bishop
- Thomas Godwin (politician) (died 1677/8), Virginia colonial politician
- Tom Godwin (1915–1980), American science fiction writer
- Tommy Godwin (footballer) (1927–1996), Irish footballer
- Tommy Godwin (cyclist, born 1912) (1912–1975), English cyclist and world record holder for miles covered in a year
- Tommy Godwin (cyclist, born 1920) (1920–2012), British track cyclist active during the 1940s and 1950s

== See also ==
- Thomas Godwyn (disambiguation)
- Thomas Goodwin (disambiguation)
