= William Bray (MP) =

British Army officer and politician (1682–1720)

William Bray (1682–1720), of Barrington Park, Gloucestershire was a British Army officer and politician who sat in the House of Commons from 1715 to 1720.

Bray was a younger son of Reginald Bray (d. 1688) of Barrington Park and his wife Jane Rainton, daughter of William Rainton of Shilton, Oxfordshire, who had a large family of 6 sons and 9 daughters. His elder brother Reginald (d. 1712) was sent to Oxford for his education, as his father had been before him. William, as a younger son, was destined for a career in the army, joining the Royal Horse Guards as a Cornet in 1700. He was promoted to captain in 1706 and became a lieutenant-colonel in the 7th Dragoons in 1711. During the War of the Spanish Succession, he served in Flanders. As his elder brother Reginald died without an heir, William succeeded to the family estate at Barrington Park in 1712.

His younger brother Edmund Bray had married a Welsh heiress and in 1715 Bray was elected Whig Member (MP) for Monmouth. He voted for the Administration, except when he cast his vote against the Peerage Bill proposed in 1719.

Bray died unmarried in April 1720, after which Barrington Park passed to his younger brother Edmund Bray.

Parliament of Great Britain
Preceded by Clayton Milborne	Member of Parliament for Monmouth Boroughs; 1715–1720	Succeeded by Andrews Windsor
