= Archdeacons in the Diocese of Derby =

Church of England ecclesiastical offices

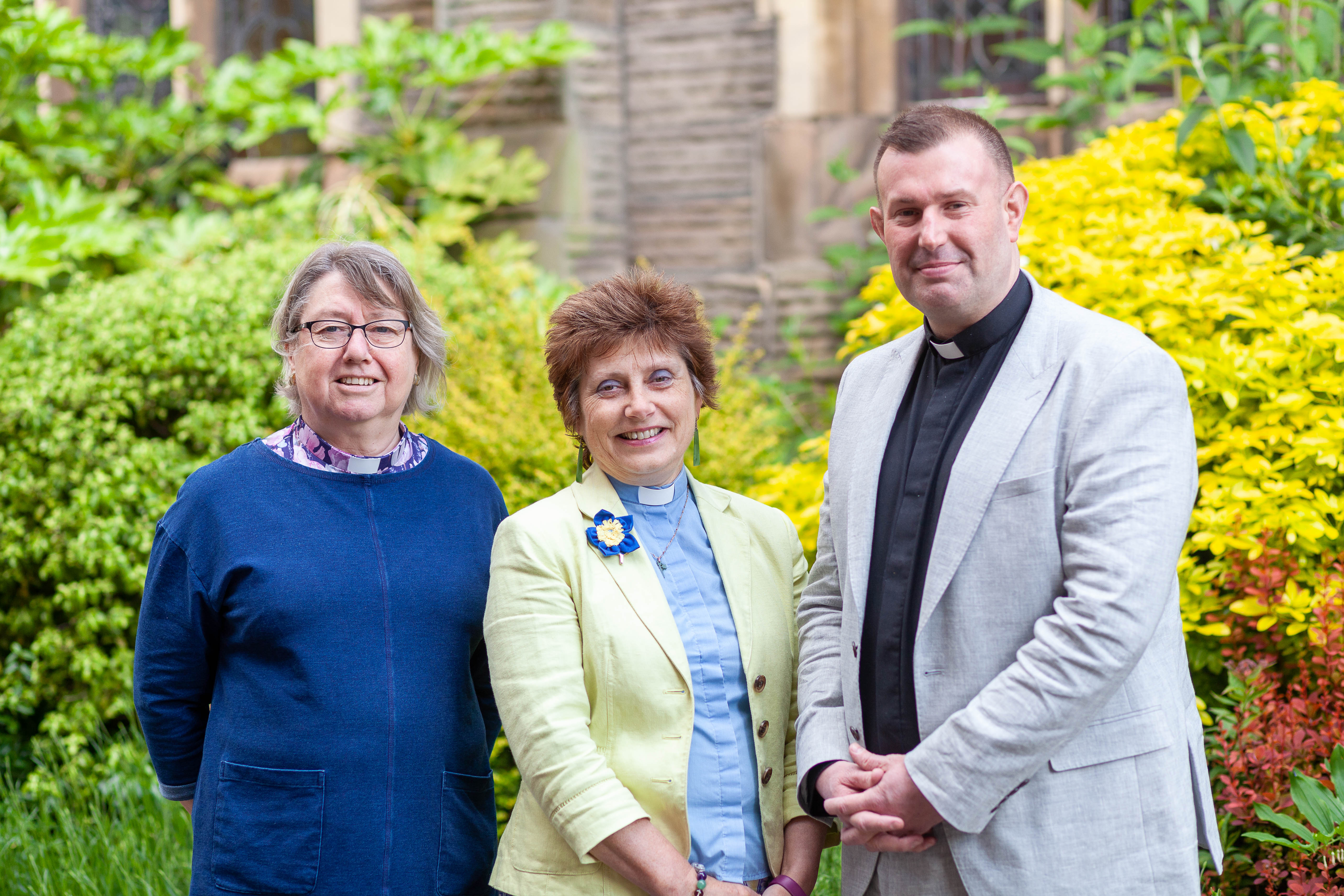
The archdeacons of the diocese: Coslett, Hamblin and Trick.

The three Archdeacons in the Diocese of Derby are senior ecclesiastical officers in the Church of England Diocese of Derby. Each archdeacon has responsibility for church buildings and clergy discipline in her/his respective archdeaconry.

== History ==
The first mentions of an archdeacon in the area occurred in the twelfth century – around the time when archdeacons' posts were first being created across England. From that earliest point until the Victorian reorganisations of church structures, the Archdeaconry of Derby was in the Diocese of Lichfield (which during those seven centuries was called in turn Coventry, Coventry & Lichfield, Lichfield & Coventry, and Lichfield). The archdeaconry, at that point covering the whole county of Derby, was transferred by Order in Council to the new Diocese of Southwell on 5 February 1884 and then split on 18 October 1910 — creating the Archdeaconry of Chesterfield — such that at its 2022 dissolution, Derby archdeaconry covered roughly the southern half of Derbyshire. On 7 July 1927, the Diocese of Derby was created from the two Southwell archdeaconries of Derby and of Chesterfield.

In 2022, the Archdeaconries of Derby and of Chesterfield were dissolved in order to erect three new archdeaconries. At the point of their dissolution: the Archdeaconry of Derby was divided into the deaneries of Derby City, Dove and Derwent, Mercia, and South East Derbyshire; and the Archdeaconry of Chesterfield, was divided into the deaneries of Carsington, Hardwick, North East Derbyshire, and Peak.

== Archdeacons of Derby ==
=== High Medieval ===
At its creation, the archdeaconry was in the Diocese of Coventry. Multiple archdeacons are named from 1086, but their territorial titles are unknown.

- bef. 1126–aft. 1140: Godfrey
- c. 1143: Roger
- c. 1155–aft. 1167: Froger (Note: Froger was a Norman in favour with Henry II, who appointed him his Almoner. Accordingly he occurs no earlier than 1155. In 1159, he was appointed Bishop of Séez. "While yet Archdeacon of Derby he transmitted to the Abbey of Mortimer en Lions a copy of the Old Testament in two volumes.")
- c. 1175: N.
- c. 1171–aft. 1182: Godfrey de Luci
- bef. 1191–aft. 1191: Yvo
- bef. 1199–aft. 1199: Vivian de Stagno
- bef. 1206–aft. 1231: William de Muschamp
- bef. 1238–aft. 1254: William de Luteby
- bef. 1256–aft. 1261: David de Sancta Frideswida
- bef. 1263–aft. 1263: William de Weston
- bef. 1278–aft. 1278: Simon
- bef. 1279–aft. 1281: Jordan de Wymburne
- bef. 1281–July 1311 (d.): Elias de Napton

=== Late Medieval ===
- 17 December 1311–February 1328 (d.): Geoffrey de Blaby or Glaston
- 15 March 1328–bef. 1338 (d.): Anthony de Monte Peliologo
- 23 February 1339–bef. 1351 (d.): John de Asheby
- 19 August 1351 – 1353 (res.): John de Marisco
- 26 November 1353–bef. 1361 (d.): Hugh de Marisco
- 17 October 1361 – 24 December 1369 (exch.): Robert de Stretton
- 24 December 1369–bef. 1381 (d.): William Lombe
- 15 November 1381 – 14 January 1418 (d.): John de Outheby
- bef. 1428–1431 (res.): Walter Bullock
- 2 September 1431 – 23 May 1473 (exch.): John Bride
- 23 May 1473–bef. 1485: William Chauntre
- 12 October 1485 – 8 May 1501 (d.): Edmund Hals
- bef. 1506–1515 (res.): Nicholas West
- 9 March 1516–bef. 1533 (res.): John Taylor (also Master of the Rolls

from 1527 and Archdeacon of Halifax from 1528)

- April 1533–7 January 1543 (d.): Richard Strete

=== Early modern ===
- 8 January 1543 – 1557 (res.): David Pole (also Archdeacon of Salop)
- November 1558 – 1559 (deprived): John Ramridge (also Dean of Lichfield)
- November 1559–September 1567 (d.): Richard Walker (also Archdeacon of Stafford)
- 17 September 1567 – 1576 (d.): Laurence Nowell (also Dean of Lichfield)
- 29 July 1577 – 1587 (d.): Luke Gilpin
- March 1588–23 November 1590 (rem.): Walter Marsh
- 23 November 1590 – 1 June 1603 (d.): John Walton
- 9 June 1603–bef. 1609: Valentine Overton
- 1609–bef. 1617: Christopher Helme
- 4 December 1617–bef. 1641 (d.): Samuel Clerk
- 1641–bef. 1666 (d.): William Higgins
- bef. 1666–1689 (res.): Thomas Brown (or Browne)
- 7 August 1689–bef. 1704 (d.): Francis Ashenhurst
- 14 December 1704–bef. 1719 (d.): Thomas Goodwin
- 24 September 1719 – 19 April 1755 (d.): Henry Ryder
- 5 May 1755–bef. 1769 (d.): Sneyd Davies
- 3 February 1769 – 28 February 1795 (d.): Henry Egerton
- 10 March 1795 – 25 April 1809 (d.): James Falconer
- 12 May 1809 – 7 February 1821 (d.): Edmund Outram
- 24 February 1821 – 1836 (res.): Samuel Butler
- 9 September 1836 – 5 May 1840 (res.): Francis Hodgson
- 30 December 1840 – 1847 (res.): Walter Shirley
- 11 January 1847 – 18 April 1873 (res.): Thomas Hill

=== Late modern ===
The archdeaconry of Derby became part of the Southwell diocese on 5 February 1884.

- 1873–29 November 1891 (d.): Edward Balston
- 1891–1900 (res.): Henry Freer
- 1900–1909 (res.): Edward Were

From 7 July 1927, the archdeaconry of Derby was in the Diocese of Derby.

- 1909–1943 (ret.): Edward Noakes (afterwards archdeacon emeritus)
- 1943–1952 (ret.): Henry FitzHerbert (afterwards archdeacon emeritus)
- 1952–1973 (ret.): John Richardson (afterwards archdeacon emeritus)
- 1973–1992 (ret.): Robert Dell (afterwards archdeacon emeritus)
- 1993–2005 (ret.): Ian Gatford
- 29 April 2006 – 31 December 2020 (ret.): Christopher Cunliffe
- 1 January 2021 – 2022 (acting): Peter Walley

The Archdeaconry of Derby was dissolved on 6 June 2022.

== Archdeacons of Chesterfield ==
- 1910–1929 (ret.): Edmond Crosse

Chesterfield archdeaconry became part of the newly created Diocese of Derby in 1927.

- 1928–1934 (res.): Geoffrey Clayton (afterwards Bishop of Johannesburg, 1934)
- 1934–1963 (ret.): Talbot Dilworth-Harrison (afterwards archdeacon emeritus)
- 1963–1978 (res.): Ingram Cleasby (afterwards Dean of Chester, 1978)
- 1978–1996 (ret.): Gerald Phizackerley (afterwards archdeacon emeritus)
- 1996–2009 (ret.): David Garnett (afterwards archdeacon emeritus)
- 2010–22 October 2016 (res.): Christine Wilson
- 1 September 2016 – 2018: Tony Kaunhoven (Acting)
- 10 March 2018 – 6 June 2022: Carol Coslett (became first Archdeacon of Derbyshire Peak and Dales)

The Archdeaconry of Chesterfield was dissolved on 6 June 2022.

== New archdeaconries ==
On 6 June 2022, Libby Lane, Bishop of Derby, dissolved the two existing Archdeaconries of Derby and of Chesterfield in order to erect three new Archdeaconries: of Derby City and South Derbyshire, of East Derbyshire, and of Derbyshire Peak and Dales. On 12 June, she collated Carol Coslett (hitherto Archdeacon of Chesterfield) as Archdeacon of Derbyshire Peak and Dales; Matthew Trick as Archdeacon of Derby City and South Derbyshire; and Karen Hamblin as Archdeacon of East Derbyshire.

Coslett retired during February 2023; her successor, Nicky Fenton, was collated on 30 September 2023. Hamblin retired in September 2025.

== Sources ==
- Le Neve, John; Hardy, Sir Thomas Duffus (1854). Archdeacons of Derby . Fasti ecclesiae Anglicanae. Vol. 1. Oxford: Oxford University Press. pp. 575–576 – via Wikisource.
- Jones, B. (1964), Fasti Ecclesiae Anglicanae 1300–1541, vol. 10, pp. 16–17
- Horn, Joyce M. (2003), Fasti Ecclesiae Anglicanae 1541–1857, vol. 10, pp. 10–12
