= Valentine Overton =

Former Archdeacon of Derby

Valentine Overton (25 October 1565; 30 August 1646) was an Anglican priest, who served as Archdeacon of Derby from 1603 until 1609.

The son of Richard Overton and nephew of Bishop William Overton, he was baptized in the parish of St. Giles without Cripplegate, London, 25 October 1565, and educated at Magdalen College, Oxford. He was for many years the incumbent at Bedworth. Overton was appointed a Canon of Lichfield in 1593.
