= Henry Egerton (priest) =

The Ven. Henry Egerton (1729–1795) was Archdeacon of Derby from 1769 until his death.

== Life ==
Egerton was son of Henry Egerton, the Bishop of Hereford. He was educated at Oriel College, Oxford, graduating B.A. in 1749 and M.A. in 1752. After university he acted as domestic chaplain to Lord James Beauclerk, his father's successor, and then Richard Lumley-Saunderson, 4th Earl of Scarbrough. He was also Rector of Bishop Wearmouth and a Prebendary of Durham.

He died on 28 February 1795. He had married Annabella Lowther, daughter of John Lowther M.D., a brother of Sir William Lowther, 1st Baronet, of Swillington; or in another source the sister of Sir William. He left no children. He became known as the "princely rector". He insisted on the traditional tithe on fishing boats, the cobles, called the "coble teen". He gave it away charitably, and was noted for lavish entertainment.

== Notes ==
Church of England titles
Preceded by Sneyd Davies	Archdeacon of Derby; 1769–1795	Succeeded by James Falconer
