= Barrington Park =

Country house in Gloucestershire, England

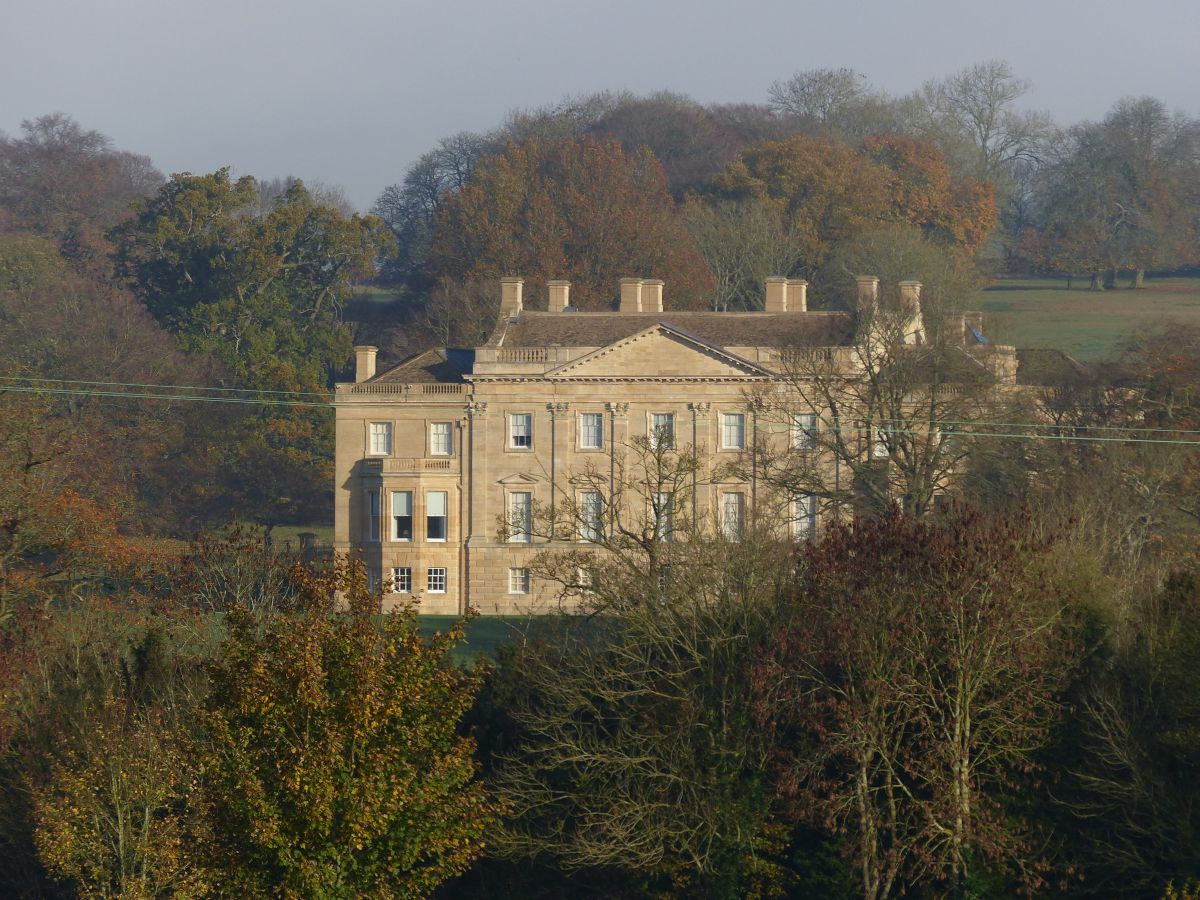
- Interactive map of the Barrington Park area

General information
- Type: Country House
- Location: Barrington, Gloucestershire, England
- Coordinates: 51.82025°N 1.70564°W
- Completed: 1738

Design and construction
- Designations: Grade I listed

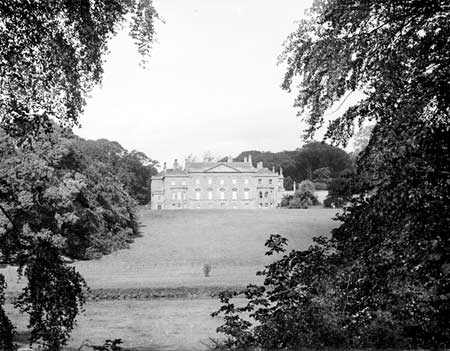
Barrington park taken by Henry Taunt

Barrington Park is a Palladian style country house standing in an estate of the same name near the villages of Great Barrington and Little Barrington, Gloucestershire, England. It is a Grade I listed building. The parkland in which it stands is Grade II* listed.

The house was built between 1736 and 1738 for Charles Talbot, Lord Chancellor to George II, for the use of his son William Talbot, 1st Earl Talbot and the latter's wife Mary de Cardonnel. It was extended in 1870-3 by Edward Rhys Wingfield.

The building is constructed in two storeys plus a basement of ashlar with a stone slate roof. It is rectangular in plan with the later extensions at both ends. The frontage has 9 bays of which the central 3 bays project.

Several of the parks features (a dovecote and two temples) are separately Grade II* listed.

== History ==
Before the Dissolution of the Monasteries the manor of Great Barrington had belonged to Llanthony Priory. In 1540 it was sold to John Guise, who in turn sold the estate to Richard Monnington and his son-in-law Reginald Bray in 1553. It then descended for over 200 years within the Bray family until Reginald Morgan Bray sold it in 1735 to the Lord Chancellor, who commissioned the building of the new house before dying shortly afterwards. His son and daughter-in-law (Mary de Cardonnel) moved in but separated in 1742, leaving Mary de Cardonnel in possession of the house. She laid out the pleasure grounds around the house.

Mary de Cardonnel's daughter, Cecil de Cardonnel, 2nd Baroness Dynevor, married George Rice, whose descendants adopted the surname of Talbot-Rice and then Rice-Trevor. They inherited the estate, it then passed by marriage to the Wingfields who adopted the name of Rhys Wingfield and in whose hands the property still remains.
