= Simon Jones (priest) =

English priest

The Very Reverend Simon Jones
- Dean of Lincoln
- Church: Church of England
- Diocese: Lincoln
- In office: September 2024 – present
- Predecessor: Christine Wilson

Orders
- Ordination: 2000 (priest)

Personal details
- Born: Simon Jones; 1972 (age 53–54)
- Denomination: Anglicanism
- Education: College of St Hild and St Bede, Durham; Selwyn College, Cambridge

Simon Jones (born May 1972) is an English priest of the Church of England. Since September 2024, he has been the Dean of Lincoln. Prior to this he was chaplain of Merton College, Oxford.

== Education and ministry ==
He was born in St Albans, Hertfordshire, in May 1972.

As an undergraduate he studied theology at the College of St Hild and St Bede, Durham. This was followed by a doctorate at Selwyn College, Cambridge in Syrian baptismal theology.

He underwent ministerial training at Westcott House, Cambridge, serving his title at St Mary the Virgin, Tewkesbury Abbey in the Diocese of Gloucester and being ordained priest in 2000. He moved to Merton College, Oxford as chaplain in 2002. Prior to becoming dean of Lincoln in September 2024, he had previously served as the cathedral's interim dean from March to December 2023.

Church of England titles
| Preceded by Christine Wilson | Dean of Lincoln; 2024– | incumbent |
