= Francis Ashenhurst =

English archdeacon (1729–1795)

The Ven. Francis Ashenhurst (1729–1795) was Archdeacon of Derby from 1689 until 1704.

Ashenhurst was born in Staffordshire. He matriculated from St Mary Hall, Oxford and was ordained in 1661. He held livings at Wootton Wawen and Kingswinford.
