= James Falconer (priest) =

English cleric

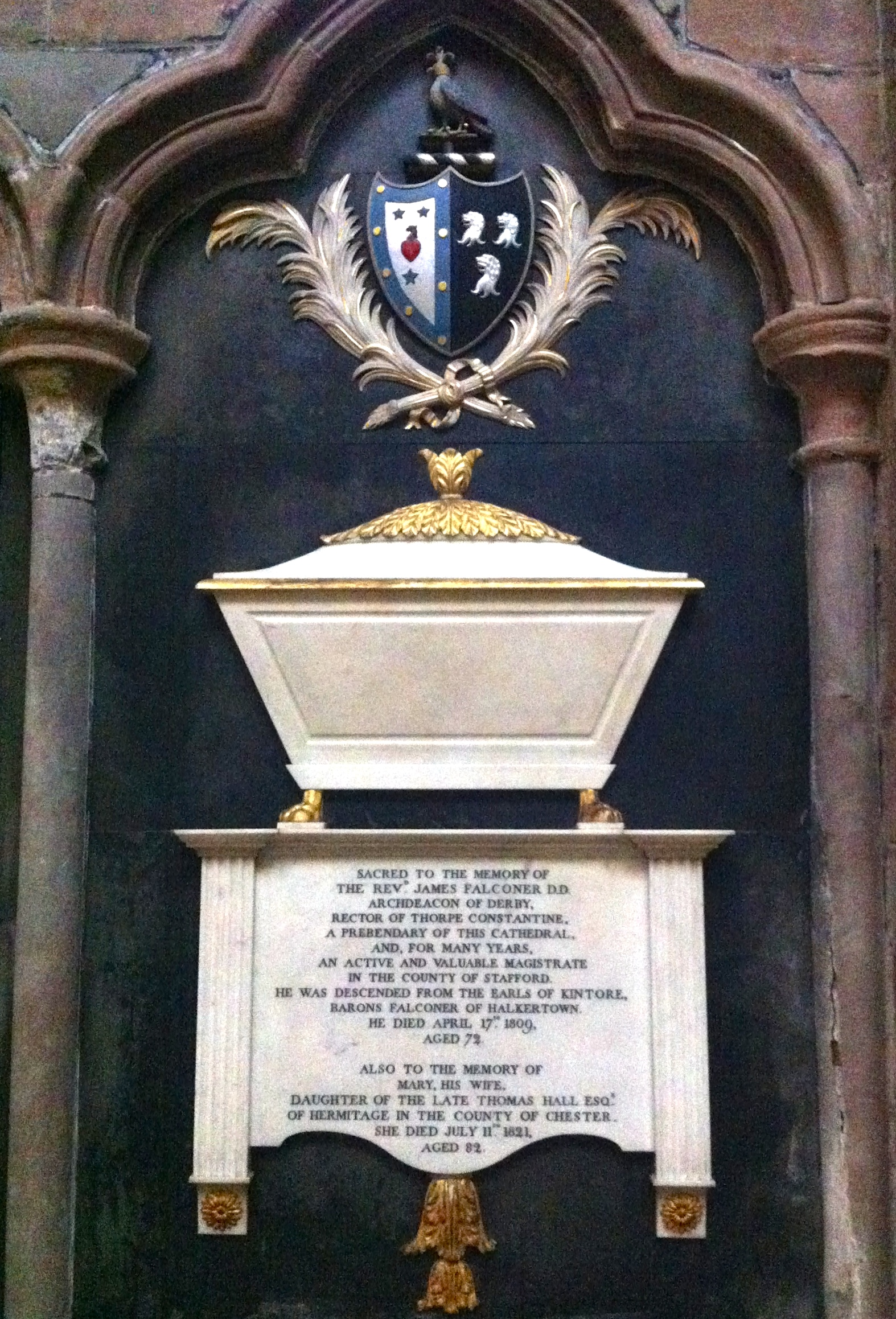
Memorial to James Falconer in Lichfield Cathedral

James Falconer (1738–1809) was an English cleric. He was Archdeacon of Derby from 1795 until his death.

== Life ==
He was the son of James Falconer of Chester, and his wife Elizabeth Inge, daughter of William Inge of Thorpe Constantine Hall; his sister Elizabeth married Thomas Pennant. He was educated at Brasenose College, Oxford. He held incumbencies at Thorpe Constantine and Lullington.

Falconer died on 25 April 1809.

== Family ==
Falconer married Mary Hall (died 1821), daughter of Thomas Hall of Armitage, and his wife Elizabeth Bayley; they had four daughters:

- Elizabeth, the eldest daughter, married the Rev. John Batteridge Pearson.
- Mary (died 1797), married in 1791 the Rev. John George Norbury (died 1800).
- Frances, married in 1793 William Charles Madan, army officer, son of Spencer Madan.
- Catherine, youngest daughter, married in 1802 Edward Miles, army officer, later knighted, as his first wife. He married again, in 1828. His daughter Mary Maria was the mother of William Edward Oakeley.

Mary Hall's sister Anne married William Inge, High Sheriff of Staffordshire in 1766. He was the son of Theodore William Inge (died 1753), and grandson of William Inge (died 1731), the Member of Parliament for Tamworth; and therefore a first cousin of the Rev. James Falconer.

== Notes ==
Church of England titles
Preceded by Henry Egerton	Archdeacon of Derby; 1795–1809	Succeeded by Edmund Outram
