= William Higgins (priest) =

Anglican priest in England

The Venerable William Higgins was an Anglican priest in England.

Higdgins was born in London and educated at Christ Church, Oxford. He held livings at Henstridge, Almondbury, Cheselbourne and Stoke on Tern. He was Canon of Lichfield Cathedral in 1633, and Precentor in 1636. Higgins was Archdeacon of Derby from 1641 until his death in 1666.
