= Edmond Crosse =

British archdeacon (1858–1941)

The Venerable Edmond Francis Crosse (1858–1941) was the first Archdeacon of Chesterfield and, from 1914, he was a Companion of the Memorial of Merit of King Charles the Martyr. He was the great-grandson of the famous Norwich surgeon John Green Crosse. From 1905 he was the Vicar of Chesterfield and then Archdeacon from 1910. He retired in 1929. He is buried in the graveyard at Little Barrington, Gloucestershire.
