= Christopher Helme (priest) =

Anglican priest and Archdeacon of Derby

The Venerable William Powell D.D. was an Anglican priest in England.

Helme was born in Wiltshire and educated at Merton College, Oxford. He was appointed Fellow in 1564 and Praelector in 1578. He held the living at Bredon from 1607 and was Archdeacon of Derby from 1609 until his deprivation in 1617. Helme died in 1628.
