= David Garnett (priest) =

David Christopher Garnett (born 26 September 1945) was Archdeacon of Chesterfield (and a canon of Derby Cathedral from 1996 until 2009. He was educated at Giggleswick School, Fitzwilliam College, Cambridge, and Westcott House, Cambridge, and ordained in 1970. After a curacy in Cottingham he was chaplain, fellow and tutor of Selwyn College, Cambridge. He held incumbencies in Patterdale, Heald Green, Christleton and Ellesmere Port before his time as archdeacon, and Edensor afterwards.

== Notes ==
Church of England titles
Preceded by Gerald Phizackerley	Archdeacon of Chesterfield; 1996 – 2009	Succeeded by Christine Wilson
