= Clayton Milborne =

English Tory politician

Clayton Milborne (born after 1676 – 1726), of Bloomsbury Square; St. Giles-in-the-Fields, Middlesex and Judde House, Ospringe, Kent, was an English Tory politician who sat in the House of Commons from 1708 to 1715.

Milborne was the eldest son of John Milborne of the Inner Temple and his wife Mary Emma Bishop, daughter of a Mr. Bishop of St. Giles-in-the-Fields. He was admitted at the Inner Temple in 1689. He succeeded his father in 1699.

Milborne was a Conservator of the Bedford Level from 1701 to his death. He was returned unopposed as Tory Member of Parliament (MP) for Monmouth Boroughs at the 1708 British general election with the backing of the Duke of Beaufort. He voted against the impeachment of Henry Sacheverell in 1710 and was returned unopposed again at the 1710 British general election. He was one of the ‘worthy patriots’ who exposed the mismanagements of the previous ministry, and a ‘Tory patriot’ who had opposed the continuation of the war. He was also a member of the October Club and the Loyal Brotherhood. He voted with the Court in support of the French commerce bill on 18 June 1713. He was returned unopposed again at the 1713 British general election but did not stand at the 1715 British general election.

Milborne married by 1714, Rebecca Johnson, the daughter of Robert Johnson. They had two sons and a daughter. He died at his home in Kent on 13 September 1726, and was buried at the parish church of St Luke, Chelsea, near his father .

Parliament of Great Britain
Preceded by Sir Thomas Powell, Bt	Member of Parliament for Monmouth Boroughs; 1708–1715	Succeeded by William Bray
