= Robert Dell (engineer) =

American sculptor, engineer, progenitor sustainable art (1950-)

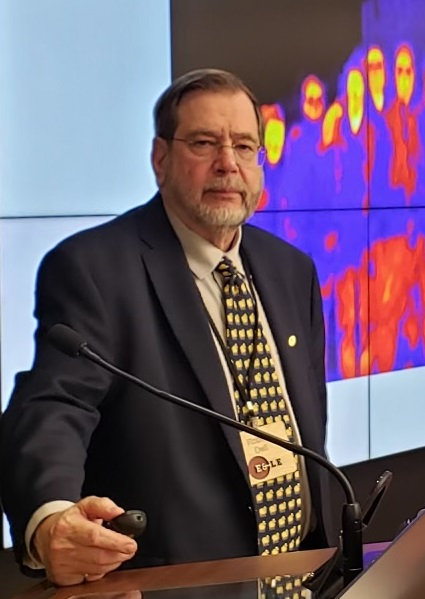
- Robert Dell, portrait, 2023
- Born: 1950 (age 75–76); Nyack, New York, US
- Education: SUNY Oneonta (B.Ed.), SUNY New Paltz (M.F.A.)
- Known for: Sculpture, Mechanical Engineering
- Movement: Sustainable Art, Geothermal Energy
- Awards: Cobb Partnership Award (2023), American Society of Mechanical Engineers Fellow (2021), American-Scandinavian Foundation Fellow (1999), MIT Center for Advanced Visual Studies Research Fellow (1993-97),Fulbright Senior Research Fellow (1988), MacDowell Colony Fellow (1980)

Robert Dell (English: /ˈrɒbərt/ /ˈdɛl/; 1950–) is an American geothermal engineer, sustainable installation artist, renewable energy expert, and was a mechanical engineering professor at The Cooper Union. He is first inventor on eleven registered patents and is a Fellow of the American Society of Mechanical Engineers. In 2023 he was the recipient of the bi-annual Cobb Partnership Award, in a ceremony at the US Embassy in Reykjavik, Iceland. The Iceland Fulbright Commission administers the selection of an American who has demonstrated a long commitment to fostering U.S. relations with Iceland and to the building of bridges between the two countries.

He is first author on over 30 international, peer-reviewed engineering research papers. Recognized as a progenitor of sustainable art, his installations incorporate art and engineering, using geothermal energy to power lasers, LEDs and create color changes in liquid crystals in his large scale stainless steel, bronze, aluminum and copper sculptures. He was a MacDowell Colony Fellow in 1980, a Fulbright Research Fellow in 1988, a Research Fellow at the Center for Advanced Visual Studies at MIT from 1993-1997, an American Scandinavian Foundation Fellow, and an Honorary Research Associate at the New York Botanical Garden from 2007-2008. In 2021, he was conferred the distinction of Fellow by the American Society of Mechanical Engineers.

He is the subject of two documentary films, Environmental Alchemy, by Gary Donatelli and Ugluspegill, by Iceland State Television in 1988.

Robert Dell's papers and drawings are permanently archived in the "Robert Dell Papers" at the Archives of American Art at the Smithsonian and the "Robert Dell Collection" at the MIT Program in Art, Culture and Technology Archives and Special Collections.

== Education ==
Receiving a Bachelors in Education from SUNY Oneonta in 1972, Dell then attended SUNY New Paltz, where he retrained himself as a sculptor, graduated with an MFA in Sculpture in 1975, and was befriended by the sculptor William King.

== Career ==
During and just after graduate school Robert partnered with his brother James in their general contracting company, Dell Brothers. He also worked as a precision TIG welder for Chromalloy on jet engine repairs. At the age of 27, he exhibited his large scale metal and laminated wood sculptures at Vorpal Gallery in the SoHo district of New York City. Subsequent solo exhibitions with Vorpal occurred in Soho, and in their branches in Chicago and San Francisco. Robert also completed Pythagoras a large scale outdoor public sculpture for the Town Hall of Orangetown, New York on a CETA grant in 1978.

In 1980, he was a MacDowell Colony Fellow and was part of the “Sculpture 1980” exhibition at Baltimore’s Maryland Institute.

When ill health necessitated that he curtail this work, he retrained as a classical painter and passed the highly competitive exam to become a Scenic Artist with United Scenic Artists Local USA 829 in New York City in 1983. He painted and sculpted scenery for television series and films including Grace Quigley (1984), One Life to Live (1990-1992), Made (2001), Swimfan (2002), in addition to sets for the Metropolitan Opera and a number of Broadway plays. On occasion, he was also an Art Director.

The sculpture work restarted, but with an acute awareness of the frailty and the ultimate persistence of life. This led to his eventually being called a "progenitor of sustainable art" by the Smithsonian's Archives of American Art. Large quartz crystal slabs were added as an embodiment of the earth’s energy. This energy was then made visible in the sculptures by converting geothermal heat into electric light during a Fulbright Senior Research Grant to Iceland in 1988, even though he had no academic affiliation. This began his pursuit of engineering.

This desire to reduce waste and to promote the use of renewable resources was the ultimate connection between his art and the engineering careers.

=== Geothermal Sculpture ===
Dell’s geothermal sculptures, first developed in 1988, have an audible hot-water circulation system that emits heat and creates light in rock crystal areas in what he calls a “slow, rhythmic ‘turtle-time’ cadence.” Using his Peltier system he directly generates electricity from the temperature difference between the geothermal heat source and ambient air. Geothermal hot water flows through pipes in the sculptures giving them what Dell calls “an almost mammalian circulation system using geothermal energy as its lifeblood." This causes liquid crystal areas to change colors so that you can literally “see the colors of the wind.” As D. Dominick Lomabardi wrote in his essay, "Robert Dell also creates earthworks: however his art is unique to this genre because he insists on leaving the earth the way he found it.” He crafted the metallic support frames by forging, welding and machining recycled stainless steel, copper, and bronze. They were specifically designed to be transportable, easily assembled and disassembled at geothermal sites, without any site disturbance other than the temporary use of small quantities of hot water. This was immediately returned to its source unchanged, except for a minor decrease in temperature.

As quoted by MacDowell Colony, “Our technological society has made a concentrated effort to control the uncontrollable – nature,” Dell has said in his artist’s statement. “I am personally distressed by our blatant disregard of our life support system that sustains us all – the Earth… [my sculptures] are visual ballads that gently sing the earth’s song to those that want to listen.” When installed in traditional gallery settings powered by his geothermal simulators, they can make people uncomfortable as they are often arranged in rows like hospital beds,"This is a deliberate effect: they do not belong there, and neither do we."

As a Research Fellow and Projects Director at the Center for Advanced Visual Studies at MIT from 1993-7, Dell developed a “geothermal simulator,” a self-contained, hot-water circulation system with adjustable temperature that uses household current. They function like a heart and lung machine in that they allow him to power his pieces in locations that do not have natural geothermal sources.

==== Critical reception ====
Dell's installations were met with varied response. While D. Dominick Lombardi in a New York Times review called his work with geothermal simulators "brilliant" despite the pieces being exhibited indoors at the Blue Hill Cultural center which he likened to "riding a bicycle indoors". His work was installed at the Firehouse Gallery in the same year and in another New York Times review they were called "quite unusual, possibly unprecedented", describing the same simulators as "glorified radiators" that "intrude detrimentally" in his sculptures. In 1997 Otto Piene, MIT Director Emeritus MIT/CAVS wrote: “Robert Dell is the genuine article – an original artist, widely self-reliant in his commitment to certain ideas: geothermal sculpture, energy conservation, “figurative” bronze sculpture... to express human life evolving from elemental earth forces. He uses technology to tap nature with exemplary and poetic results. Water becomes a witches’ brew to generate light, a drink of energy. The artist Robert Dell stands alone (almost) in this appeal to the common plenty.”

==== Exhibitions ====
Robert Dell’s geothermal sculpture was first installed in 1988 at Seltun hot springs in Krisuvik, Iceland as part of his Fulbright Grant. The next officially sanctioned geothermal installations were at Yellowstone National Park’s Grotto, Castle and Old Faithful Geyser Groups in 1996, and at the Great Geysir in Iceland in 1999 when he was an American Scandinavian Fellow to Iceland. His work Hitavaettur thermal guardian is a permanent installation at Perlan in Reykjavík, Iceland where it is powered by the municipal geothermal hot water that heats the city.

Dell's work has been shown widely at galleries, museums, and universities around the world including in Iceland, Boston area, San Francisco, Chicago, and New York City. Solo installations included MIT's Kresge Oval, Harvard University's Carpenter Center, the Reykjavik Art Museum and the Akureyri Art Museum in Iceland, the LAB Gallery in New York City, and MIT's ACT Cube in 2020.

=== Engineering ===
Ill health again demanded retraining, this time in engineering and writing. He joined the Cooper Union’s Albert Nerken School of Engineering in 2003, initially as an adjunct professor of design and artist in residence (MIT archive) and soon became an adjunct professor of mechanical engineering. He taught senior projects, mechanical engineering independent study and co-advised master's theses. He was principal investigator for Consolidated Edison on numerous Steam Engineering grants and was project engineer and research fellow for the Cooper Union and the Cooper Union Research Foundation. In 2005, Dell became a member of The American Society of Mechanical Engineers following a review by the membership committee, without a formal engineering degree, and went on to be named an ASME fellow.

He developed an award winning intensive outdoor heated ground agriculture system for heated green roofs in New York City and Icelandic fields using waste fluid from geothermal, municipal steam, and Cogen (CHP) sources that greatly increases plant growth while saving valuable potable cooling water. This increases carbon sequestration. It has also enabled small out of region crop harvests, including cotton in New York City and oregano in Iceland.

These were monitored using his stand-alone patented thermoelectric generators that powered large web cameras, computers, robots, and other control equipment. It used the heat from the surface of a low temperature geothermal waste heat steam pipe in Iceland as its energy source. In 2015, NASA filed a notice of interest in this invention with the United States Patent Office because it “appears to have significant utility in the conduct of aeronautical and space activities”.

Dell was the founding Director of the Laboratory for Energy Reclamation and Innovation from 2008 to 2023 at the Cooper Union, and was their founding Director of the Center for Innovation and Applied Technology from 2012 to 2019.

He was also appointed at the Cooper Union as Director of the Special Project on Select Patent Monetization, with additional appointments as the Research Fellow for the C.V. Starr Research Foundation. Other appointments include Guest Lecturer with the National Autonomous University of Mexico (UNAM) in Mexico City, and Advisory Board Member with Borealis GeoPower Inc. in Canada and Visiting Scientist with Iceland’s Keilir Institute of Technology.

Dell was the Project Research Scientist on a grant from the New York State Energy Research and Development Agency (NYSERDA) PON 2244, for Regenerative Drive Elevator Technology in 2012, and a Technical Consultant for The U.S. Department of Energy's Small Business Innovation Research (SBIR) and Small Business Technology Transfer (STTR) in 2015.

He is the Senior Researcher and Design Engineer of the Low-Temperature Cascade Utilization Group with the University of Iceland’s Faculty of Industrial Engineering, Mechanical Engineering and Computer Science in the School of Engineering and Natural Sciences. Previous appointments with them included: Visiting Academic (2009–12), and Visiting Research Fellow with University of Iceland Research Stations (2008–12) in Hveragerdi.

Dell is the first inventor on eleven registered patents through his work at the Cooper Union. He is the first author of numerous engineering peer reviewed research conference papers for venues including the International Conference of Experimental Mechanics (ICEM), The American Society of Mechanical Engineers (ASME), The World Geothermal Congress (WGC), The Geothermal Resources Council (GRC). Other research papers venues included the Geo-Heat Center at the Oregon Institute of Technology, the Cooper Union Research Foundation, and for European Economic Area (EEA) Norway Grants in Romania. He was an active member of the American Society of Mechanical Engineers (ASME), the Geothermal Resources Council (GRC), the American Welding Society (AWS), the Order of The Engineer, and the Municipal Planning Federation of Rockland County. His continual appointments with the Town of Orangetown (pop.45,000) in New York State from 1979 -2022 included Vice Chairman of the Architecture and Community Appearance Board of Review and Planning Board Chairman.

== Personal life ==
Robert Dell was born in 1950 in Nyack, New York. He is married to artist Siena Gillann Porta. He has three children, Robert, Terrence, and Malcolm, and two grandchildren.
