= Edward Balston =

English schoolmaster and cleric

- Born: 26 November 1817
- Died: 29 November 1891 (aged 74)

Edward Balston (26 November 1817 – 29 November 1891) was an English schoolmaster, Church of England cleric, Head Master of Eton College from 1862 to 1868 and later Rector of Hitcham, Buckinghamshire, Vicar of Bakewell, Derbyshire, and Archdeacon of Derby.

== Life ==
Balston was the son of William Balston, a paper-maker, by his marriage to Catherine, daughter of Thomas Vallance, of Cheapside, wholesale stationer. He was born at Maidstone, Kent, on 26 November 1817 and baptised on 23 December. He was educated at Eton, then admitted to King's College, Cambridge, on 21 November 1836, matriculating in the Lent term of 1837. He was the Browne medallist every year from 1836 to 1839 and won the Davies Scholarship in 1839, unusually being elected a Fellow of his college in 1839 before graduating Bachelor of Arts in 1841 and proceeding Master of Arts in 1844. In 1841 he was ordained a deacon of the Church of England and in 1842 a priest.

Although Balston held his Fellowship at King's until 1850, in 1840 he returned to Eton as an assistant master, where in 1860 he became a Fellow and on 25 February 1862 Head Master. In 1865 his university honoured him with the degree of Doctor of Divinity.

Questioned by the Clarendon Commission on 9 July 1862, Balston came under attack for his view that in the classroom little time could be spared for subjects other than classical studies. Lord Clarendon said to him -

Nothing can be worse than this state of things, when we find modern languages, geography, history, chronology and everything else which a well-educated English gentleman ought to know given up in order that the full time should be devoted to the classics; and, at the same time, we are told that the boys go up to Oxford, not only not proficient, but in a lamentable deficiency in respect of the classics.

Balston replied that there were occasional lectures at Eton on scientific subjects and that some time could be spared for the French language, conceding that it might be possible to make that a compulsory subject in some forms of the school, but that he would prefer to teach English rather than French. It remained his view that in most lower forms of the school the boys' time should be devoted entirely to classical studies.

In 1868 Balston left Eton (while remaining a Fellow) to take on a parish benefice as rector of Hitcham, Buckinghamshire, and in 1869 moved on again to become vicar of Bakewell, Derbyshire, where in 1872 he was appointed a rural dean and in 1873 as Archdeacon of Derby, remaining as vicar and archdeacon until his death in 1891.

In 1850 Balston married Harriet Anne, a daughter of Thomas Carter, Fellow of Eton College. He died at Bakewell on 29 November 1891 and was buried at Eton.

== Notes ==
Academic offices
Preceded by Charles Old Goodford	Head Master of Eton College; 1862–1868	Succeeded by James John Hornby
