= Thomas Goodwin (Archdeacon of Derby) =

English Anglican priest (c. 1660–1719)

The Venerable Thomas Goodwin, D.D. (c. 1660–1719) was an Anglican priest in England.

Goodwin was born at Hinton, Hampshire and educated at Magdalen College, Oxford. He held living at Slimbridge, Wood Eaton, Droxford and Launton. He was appointed Warden of the Hospital of St John Baptist without the Barrs, Lichfield and Archdeacon of Derby in 1704, holding both positions until his death on 10 June 1719.
