= Little Barrington =

Village in Gloucestershire, England

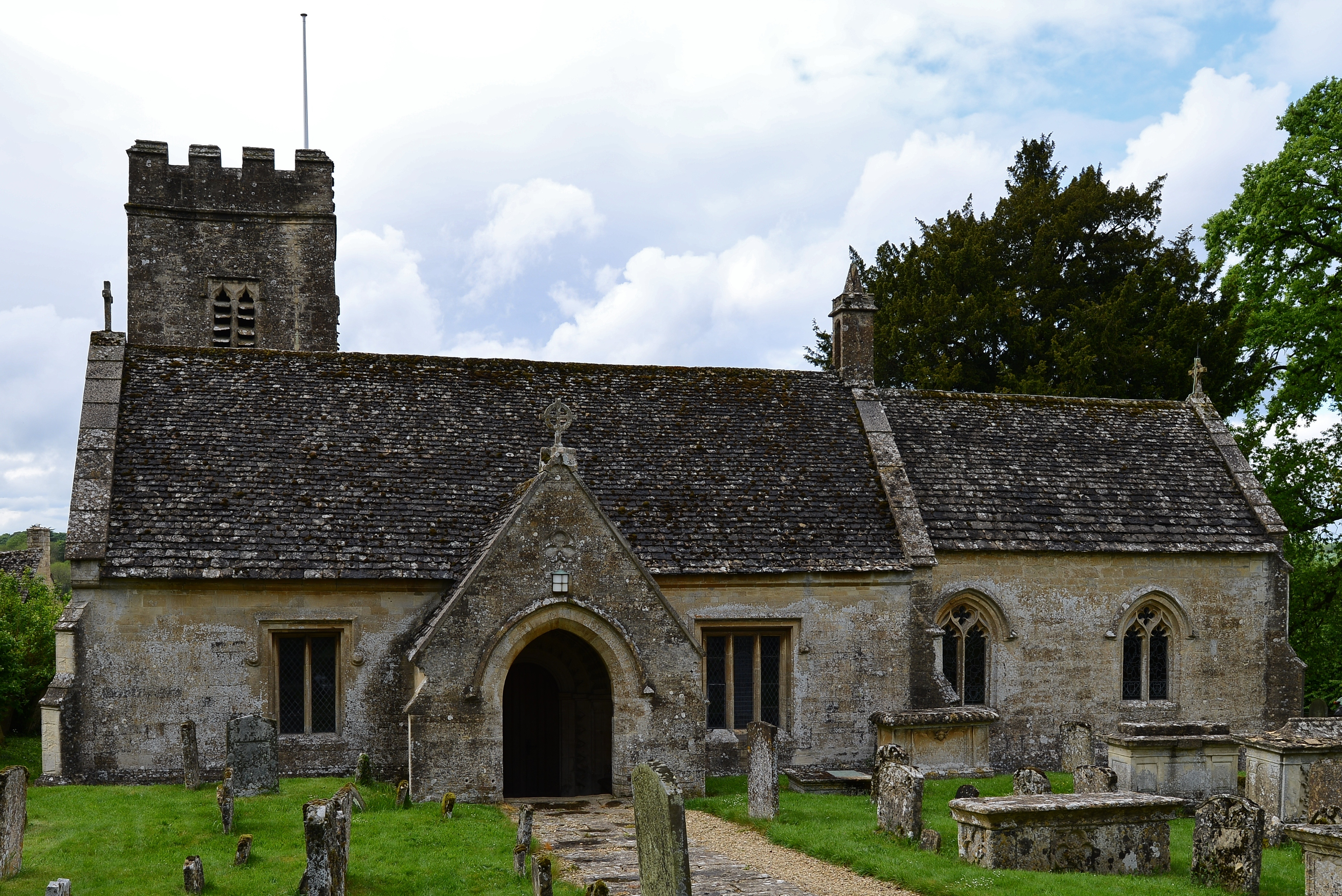
- St Peter's Church, Little Barrington

- Location within Gloucestershire
- Civil parish: Barrington
- District: Cotswold
- Shire county: Gloucestershire
- Region: South West
- Country: England
- Sovereign state: United Kingdom
- Post town: Burford
- Postcode district: OX18
- Police: Gloucestershire
- Fire: Gloucestershire
- Ambulance: South Western
- UK Parliament: North Cotswolds

Little Barrington is a village and former civil parish, now in the parish of Barrington, in the Cotswold district of Gloucestershire, England. It lies on the south bank of the River Windrush, 3 miles (4.8 km) west of the town of Burford. In 1931 the parish had a population of 84.

The Church of St Peter in Little Barrington was built in the late 12th century. It is a grade I listed building.

The Fox Inn, beside the River Windrush, is a Grade II listed building. South of the village, on the A40 road from Oxford to Cheltenham, the Inn for All Seasons is a coaching inn, historically known as the New Inn, also a listed building.

The village is grouped around a triangular green in a fold of the Windrush valley. Historically the village east of the green was in the ancient parish of Little Barrington, whereas the village west of the green was part of the ancient parish of Great Barrington. In 1866 the two parishes became civil parishes, but on 1 April 1935 were abolished and merged to form the civil parish of Barrington.

Barrington Grove, east of the village, is a manor house dating from the 17th century.

== Famous people ==
The Venerable Edmond Francis Crosse, the first Archdeacon of Chesterfield, is buried in the church yard in Little Barrington.
