= Henry FitzHerbert (priest) =

The Ven. Henry Edward FitzHerbert, MA (29 December 1882 – 23 April 1958) was Archdeacon of Derby from 1943 to 1952.

A younger son of Sir Richard FitzHerbert, 5th baronet, he was educated at Charterhouse School and Trinity Hall, Cambridge and ordained deacon in 1912 and priest in 1913. His first post was as a Curate at Blidworth. After a curacy at Blidworth he was Rector of Thrapston and Rural Dean of Higham Ferrers. After further Incumbencies in Benefield, Flaunden, Netherseal and Weston-on-Trent he became an Honorary Chaplain to the King in 1940; and continued (as Honorary Chaplain to the Queen after 1952) until 1955.

In 1907, FitzHerbert married Margaret Elinor, only daughter of William Holmes à Court, 3rd Baron Heytesbury. They had four daughters and three sons, including Sir John Richard Frederick FitzHerbert, 8th Baronet (1913–1989).

== Notes ==
Church of England titles
Preceded by Edward Spencer Noakes	Archdeacon of Derby; 1943–1952	Succeeded by John Farquhar Richardson
