= Philip Buckler =

American dean

Philip John Warr Buckler (born 26 April 1949) was a dean of Lincoln, a post he has held from 2007 until 2016.

== Education ==
Buckler was educated at Highgate School and St Peter's College, Oxford, before training for the priesthood at Cuddesdon College, Oxford.

== Ministry ==
From 1972 to 1975, Buckler was curate at Bushey Heath in St Albans. He then became chaplain of Trinity College, Cambridge from 1975 to 1981. In 1981, he moved to St Paul's Cathedral to become minor canon and sacrist; a post he held until 1986.

Buckler was appointed vicar of Hampstead in 1987, and he was also area dean of North Camden between 1993 and 1998. He became a canon residentiary of St Paul's Cathedral, London, in 1999 before becoming canon treasurer in 2000.

On 26 September 2006, it was announced that Buckler was to be the dean of Lincoln; he was installed on 3 February 2007 and retired on 31 January 2016.

== Styles ==
- The Reverend Philip Buckler (1974–1999)
- The Reverend Canon Philip Buckler (1999–2007)
- The Very Reverend Philip Buckler (2007–2016)
- The Reverend Philip Buckler (2016–present)
