= Robert Dell (priest) =

The Ven. Robert Sydney Dell, MA (20 May 1922 – 19 January 2008) was Archdeacon of Derby from 1973 to 1992.

He was educated at Harrow County School for Boys, Emmanuel College, Cambridge and Ridley Hall, Cambridge. He was ordained in 1948. His first posts were curacies in Islington and Cambridge. He was then successively: Chaplain at Wrekin College., Vicar of Mildenhall, Suffolk, Vice-Principal of Ridley Hall, Cambridge, Vicar of Chesterton, Cambridge and Canon Residentiary at Derby Cathedral.

== Notes ==
Church of England titles
Preceded by John Farquhar Richardson	Archdeacon of Derby; 1973–1992	Succeeded by Ian Gatford
