= Brian Healy (footballer) =

Scottish footballer

Personal information
- Full name: Brian Healy
- Date of birth: 27 December 1968 (age 57)
- Place of birth: Glasgow, Scotland
- Height: 6 ft 1 in (1.85 m)
- Position: Midfielder

Senior career*
Years	Team	Apps	(Gls)
- West Auckland
–1989	Billingham Town		
1989–1993	Bishop Auckland		
1993	Gateshead	11	(2)
1993–1996	Spennymoor United		
1996–1998	Morecambe		
1998–2001	Torquay United	59	(11)
2001–2002	Darlington	2	(1)
2002–?	Bishop Auckland		

International career
	England C	1	(0)

Managerial career
- 2005–2007: Bishop Auckland
- * Club domestic league appearances and goals

Brian Healy (born 27 December 1968) is a Scottish former professional footballer. He was born in Glasgow and played professionally for Torquay United and Darlington. As a non-league player he represented both the England semi-professional side and the Middlesex Wanderers. He is a qualified building inspector and supplemented his football income by running his own shop/office design business.

Healy began his career with West Auckland, later playing for Billingham Town before joining Bishop Auckland in 1989. He was a vital part of the Bishop's side that reached the second round of the FA Cup in the 1989–90 season, scoring the winner against Tow Law Town in the first round, and also scoring the first goal in Bishops' defeat away to Crewe Alexandra in the Second Round.

Healy before joined Gateshead towards the end of the 1992–93 season. He scored twice in 11 games before leaving to join Spennymoor United, leaving them three years later to join Morecambe.

At Morecambe, Healy was named twice in the Conference team of the year, represented the England semi-professional side when he played against the Netherlands and was later selected for a tour of the Far East with the Middlesex Wanderers. He finally made the move to professional football when he left Morecambe, Torquay United paying £25,000 for him on 16 December 1998. His league debut came on 28 December, when he replaced Kevin Hill as a second-half substitute in Torquay's 2–0 win at home to Southend United. He quickly settled into playing in a higher division, his distribution and awareness combining nicely with the ability to shoot well with either foot. He was appointed club captain by manager Wes Saunders, but missed the entire 2000–01 season through a cruciate ligament injury.

He battled his way back to full fitness and featured in the first two league games of the new season. However, it swiftly appeared that Healy did not fit into new manager Roy McFarland's plans, and he was transfer listed on 28 August 2001. On 10 September he began a trial at Hull City, but after 2 weeks at Boothferry Park returned to Torquay. At the end of September he joined Hartlepool United on trial, but no offer was made. He was released by Torquay on 17 October 2001 and returned to his home in the north-east. The following month he joined Darlington, initially on a one-month contract, with a view to a permanent deal, scoring on his debut in the 1–0 home win over Oxford United on 10 November. His contract was extended for a further month, but in January 2002 Healy was released by Darlington manager Tommy Taylor.

On leaving Darlington Healy rejoined Bishop Auckland, later coaching Billingham Synthonia.

Healy was appointed manager of Bishop Auckland in October 2005, and was unable to prevent the club from being relegated from the Northern Premier League Division One. He resigned from his post in February 2007.
