= Tommy Goodwin (footballer) =

English footballer

Personal information
- Full name: Thomas Neil Goodwin
- Date of birth: 8 November 1979 (age 46)
- Place of birth: Leicester, England
- Position: Central defender

Youth career
- 1996–1998: Leicester City

Senior career*
Years	Team	Apps	(Gls)
1998–2001	Leicester City	1	(0)
2001–2003	Shepshed Dynamo	-	(-)
2003–2005	Hinckley United	19	(0)
2005	Solihull Borough (loan)	-	(-)
2005–2007	Quorn	14	(1)
- * Club domestic league appearances and goals

Thomas Neil Goodwin (born 8 November 1979) is an English football defender.

== Career ==
Goodwin first entered the senior picture with Leicester City during their heavy pre-season schedule of 1999, earning a Premier League appearance in the injury-hit side that lost at home to West Ham United as Leicester tried to patch up its wounded for the impending League Cup semi-finals and still found itself applauded from the pitch. Goodwin didn't make another appearance for the Foxes and less than a year later found himself attempting to impress in reserve football at Northampton Town, Barnet, Peterborough United and Kidderminster Harriers, prior to his release by Leicester. On settling at Shepshed Dynamo, Goodwin also briefly assumed the Commercial Manager's role there and faced Leicester in the 2003 County Challenge Cup Final. In early 2006, he received a six-month ban from football after a bitterly contested allegation that he attacked a linesman during Quorn's match at Boldmere.
