= Barrington, Gloucestershire =

Civil parish in Gloucestershire, England

Barrington
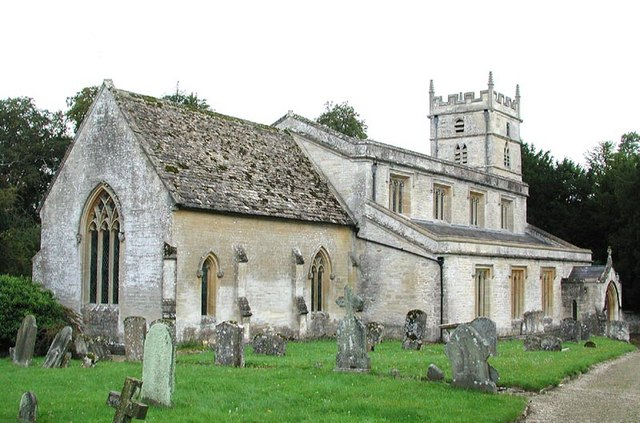
- St. Mary's Church, Great Barrington

- Location within Gloucestershire
- Population: 205 (2011 Census)
- District: Cotswold
- Shire county: Gloucestershire
- Region: South West
- Country: England
- Sovereign state: United Kingdom
- Post town: Burford
- Postcode district: OX18
- Police: Gloucestershire
- Fire: Gloucestershire
- Ambulance: South Western
- UK Parliament: North Cotswolds
- Website: Barrington Parish Council

Barrington is a civil parish in the Cotswold district of Gloucestershire, England. In the 2011 census it had a population of 205.

The parish includes the villages of Great Barrington and Little Barrington, on either side of the River Windrush. To the east the parish borders Oxfordshire. To the south the parish includes a section of the A40 road from Oxford to Cheltenham, and extends to the B4425 road from Burford to Cirencester.

The civil parish was created in 1935 from the former civil parishes of Great Barrington and Little Barrington and a small area of Eastleach Turville, when those civil parishes were abolished.
