= Ingram Cleasby =

British Dean

(Thomas Wood) Ingram Cleasby was the Dean of Chester in the latter part of the 20th century.

== Biography ==
Ingram Cleasby was born on 27 March 1920 in Kendal, Westmorland, England, and was educated at Sedbergh and Magdalen College, Oxford. His family farmed at Ravenseat, and his name, Ingram, is Anglo-Saxon for raven, or raven's nest, after the farm.

He saw active service with the British Army during the Second World War, receiving a commission as a second lieutenant into the Border Regiment on 14 December 1940, his service number being 160854. Cleasby was posted to the regiment's 1st Battalion, a Regular Army unit. The battalion was one of four which formed part of the 31st Independent Brigade, and in late 1941 was transferred to the airborne forces, with the brigade being redesignated the 1st Airlanding Brigade, which now formed part of Major General Frederick Browning's 1st Airborne Division. After training throughout 1942 most of the division, now under Major General George Hopkinson, departed for North Africa in April 1943, and Cleasby's 1st Airlanding Brigade, under Brigadier Philip Hicks, took part in the Allied invasion of Sicily (see Operation Ladbroke). The brigade, including Cleasby's battalion, suffered heavily before being withdrawn to North Africa. In September it landed in Italy and fought briefly in the early stages of the Italian Campaign until again being withdrawn, this time to the United Kingdom, arriving there in mid-December. Not involved in the Normandy landings, the division, now under Major General Roy Urquhart, participated in September 1944 in Operation Market Garden. By this time Cleasby was Officer Commanding (OC) the Support Company's Machine Gun Group, and during the Battle of Arnhem he was wounded in action and captured, spending the rest of the war as a prisoner of war (POW) until his release in April 1945, shortly before the end of World War II in Europe the following month.

He was ordained in 1954. Initially a Curate at Huddersfield Parish Church he became Chaplain to the Archbishop of York in 1952. Following this he was Anglican Chaplain to the University of Nottingham and then Archdeacon of Chesterfield (1963–1978) before his elevation to the Deanery. Described in his Daily Telegraph obituary as a "broad, inclusive, traditional Anglican", he died in Dent, Cumbria, at the age of 88 on 9 February 2009.

== Notes ==
Church of England titles
Preceded by George William Outram Addleshaw	Dean of Chester; 1978 – 1986	Succeeded by Stephen Stewart Smalley
