= Weyland =

Weyland may refer to:

- Weyland (surname), including a list of people and fictional characters with the name
- Wayland the Smith, or Weyland, a legendary blacksmith in Germanic and Norse mythology
- Weyland-Yutani Corporation, Weyland Industries, and the Weyland family, fictional entities in the Alien vs. Predator franchise
- Weyland International, a fictional organization in the Death Race franchise
- Weyland Consortium, a fictional corporation in Android: Netrunner
- Point Weyland, headland in South Australia
- Weyland Mountains or Köbowrè Range, in Western New Guinea

== See also ==
- Wayland (disambiguation)
- Weiland (disambiguation)
- Wieland (disambiguation)
- Woland
- Wyland (disambiguation)
