= Wayland =

Wayland may refer to:

- Wayland (name), given name and surname
  - Wayland the Smith, figure from northern European mythology

== Fiction ==
- Jace Wayland, a character in the Mortal Instruments book series
- Wayland (Star Wars), a planet in the Star Wars fictional universe
- Turk Wayland, in the Rennie Stride mystery series by Patricia Kennealy-Morrison

== Places ==
=== United Kingdom ===
- HM Prison Wayland, Norfolk
- Wayland, Norfolk
- Wayland Wood, near Watton, Norfolk
- Wayland Rural District, merged into Breckland District, Norfolk, UK
- Wayland's Smithy, a Neolithic site in the UK

=== United States ===
==== Cities, towns, and communities ====
- Wayland, Iowa, a village
- Wayland, Kentucky, a city
- Wayland, Massachusetts, a town
- Wayland, Michigan, a city
  - Wayland Township, Michigan, a township which borders the city in Allegan County
- Wayland, Missouri, a city
- Wayland Township, Chariton County, Missouri, a township
- Wayland, New York, a town
  - Wayland (village), New York, a village within the town
- Wayland, Ohio, an unincorporated community

==== Other places ====
- Wayland Baptist University (Alaska)
- Wayland Baptist University (Texas)
- Wayland Seminary, the Washington, D.C. school of the National Theological Institute
- Wayland Square, a neighborhood of Providence, Rhode Island
  - Wayland Historic District, a designated historical place within the Providence neighborhood

== Other ==
- Wayland (band), a US rock music band
- Wayland (protocol), a graphical display system for Unix-like operating systems

== See also ==
- Wayland Academy (disambiguation)
- Waylon (disambiguation)
- Wieland (disambiguation)
- Weiland (disambiguation)
- Weyland (disambiguation)
- Wyland (disambiguation)
