= Jesper Christiansen (footballer, born 1978) =

Danish footballer (born 1978)

Personal information
- Full name: Jesper Ringsborg Christiansen
- Date of birth: 24 April 1978 (age 48)
- Place of birth: Roskilde, Denmark
- Height: 1.93 m (6 ft 4 in)
- Position: Goalkeeper

Team information
- Current team: Fremad Amager (assistant)

Youth career
- Borup IF
- Ringsted IF

Senior career*
Years	Team	Apps	(Gls)
1997–1998	Roskilde	0	(0)
1998	Ølstykke	4	(0)
1999–2000	OB	12	(0)
2000–2003	Rangers	3	(0)
2002	→ Vejle (loan)	14	(0)
2002–2003	→ Wolfsburg (loan)	0	(0)
2004–2005	Viborg	46	(0)
2005–2010	Copenhagen	210	(0)
2010–2012	Elfsborg	26	(0)
2012–2014	OB	16	(0)
2014–2016	Vendsyssel	60	(0)
2016–2017	Vendsyssel	26	(0)
2017–2018	AB	1	(0)
2019	Viborg	0	(0)
2022	Vejby/Tisvilde		
Total		348	(0)

International career
1998–1999	Denmark U21	5	(0)
2002–2010	Denmark	11	(0)

Managerial career
- 2017–2018: AB (player-assistant)
- 2018–2019: Fremad Amager (gk coach)
- 2019–2020: Viborg (gk coach)
- 2020–2021: Fremad Amager (gk coach)
- 2021: Fremad Amager (caretaker)
- 2022–2023: Nykøbing FC (gk coach)
- 2023–2025: Vejby/Tisvilde Fodbold
- 2026–: Fremad Amager (assistant)
- * Club domestic league appearances and goals

Jesper Ringsborg Christiansen (born 24 April 1978) is a Danish former professional footballer who played as a goalkeeper.

He has previously played for Danish Superliga clubs OB, Vejle, Viborg and Copenhagen, winning four Superliga championships and two Danish Cup trophies with Copenhagen. He has also played for Scottish Premier League club Rangers and Swedish club Elfsborg.

Christiansen was named the 2005, 2006 and 2007 Danish Goalkeeper of the Year. He has played 11 games for the Denmark national team, and represented Denmark at the 2002 and 2010 FIFA World Cup tournaments as an unused understudy of Thomas Sørensen.

== Club career ==
=== Danish breakthrough ===
Born in Roskilde, Christiansen competed with later national team player Peter Madsen to be the best forward on Zealand in his teenage years. At 17, he did not want the life of a professional footballer, and chose to play amateur football in Serie 3, the fourth lowest level of Danish football. For fun, he tried playing the position of goalkeeper, in which position he caught the attention of higher ranking clubs. Roskilde B 1906 offered him a contract in 1997, and he was Roskilde's goalkeeper for one season, before he followed his coach to Ølstykke.

In 1998, he moved to OB in the second tier of Danish football, the Danish 1st Division. He helped OB win promotion to the top-flight Danish Superliga, where he got his national breakthrough. When OB legend Lars Høgh retired in January 2000, a string of strong displays by Christiansen showed a strong temper and good reflexes. He looked the long-term replacement of Lars Høgh, though Christiansen never got the chance to make a decent bid for Høgh's record 817 games for OB. As Scottish club Rangers suffered injuries in their goalkeeping staff, the search for replacements turned to Christiansen, who was eager to move abroad at 22 years of age.

=== On the bench in Glasgow ===
In Glasgow, he played alongside fellow Dane Peter Løvenkrands, with whom he became good friends, and he played a handful of games in his first time at Rangers, including a few outings in the UEFA Champions League. His league debut was a 3–0 home defeat to Kilmarnock. When first choice goalkeeper Stefan Klos returned from his injury, he once again took control of the goalkeeper spot. Christiansen could not force his way into the starting line-up, and he was put on loan.

His first loan deal with Danish Superliga club Vejle in 2001 was a personal success for Christiansen. Though Vejle was relegated to the 1st Division, he was called up to the Danish national team. After the period in Vejle, Christiansen was loaned out to VfL Wolfsburg. This period was one of the worst in his career, the result being that he was dropped from the national team. He did not play a single first team game for Wolfsburg, and did not make many friends in Germany. Christiansen later said he would rather warm the bench at Rangers, than in Wolfsburg.

=== Danish success ===
In the winter transfer window of the 2003–04 Superliga season, Christiansen returned to Denmark once more to play for Viborg, following a string of goalkeeper switches; former Viborg goalkeeper Arek Onyszko moving to Odense, replacing Karim Zaza, who had transferred to Brøndby. At Viborg, Christiansen showed the impressive form that he had displayed for Odense and Vejle once more.

Following one and a half years at Viborg, Christiansen moved to Copenhagen (FCK) in the summer of 2005. At FCK, he was assigned the no. 1 jersey as the club's first choice for the goalkeeping position. His debut in the FCK-jersey came on 20 July 2005, keeping a clean sheet as AaB were defeated 1–0 at Aalborg Stadion in Aalborg. In the autumn 2006, he was an important part of FCK's participation in the 2006–07 UEFA Champions League, producing many great saves. This brought renewed interest from foreign clubs, as he and teammate Michael Silberbauer were both rumoured on their way to English club Everton in the 2006 winter transfer window. The transfer never materialized, and in January 2007, Christiansen expressed his desire to further his career by moving to a club in a bigger league, but a new five-year contract cancelled every rumour.

In the opening match of the 2007–08 season, against Nordsjælland at Farum Park, Christiansen was close to score on a header, as it hit the inside of the post, and was parried by Nordsjælland keeper Kim Christensen, after a corner kick deep into extra time. In May 2008 he was linked with a £1 million move to West Bromwich Albion. For the 2009–10 season, FCK bought Johan Wiland as a backup. When Christiansen was injured against Brøndby IF in the seventh Superliga game of the season, Wiland replaced him with such success that Christiansen was permanently demoted to the bench. Media reports suggested he wanted a transfer, and when FCK bought Kim Christensen as a new backup keeper in the Summer 2010, Christiansen was expected to leave the club.

He signed for Elfsborg of the Allsvenskan championship in June 2010.

== International career ==
During his time with Vejle, Christiansen was called up for the senior national team by national team manager Morten Olsen. He was chosen for the Danish squad at the 2002 FIFA World Cup in South Korea and Japan as a backup for starting national team goalkeeper Thomas Sørensen, and was an unused substitute throughout the tournament.

In his time at Viborg, Christiansen was recalled to the Danish national team, and made his national team debut on 2 June 2005, in a 1–0 friendly match win against Finland. He played his second game in October 2005, when he came on as a substitute in a 2006 FIFA World Cup qualification 2–1 win against Kazakhstan. He quickly established himself as an understudy for Thomas Sørensen, and made a number of appearances at times when Sørensen was injured.

Before the 2010 FIFA World Cup, Christiansen lacked playing time at FCK, and found himself in contention with Kim Christensen for the spot as third goalkeeper in the squad for the finals. Eventually Morten Olsen chose Christiansen for his team, and he spent his time at the tournament as an unused substitute.

== Coaching career ==
After Christiansen left Vendsyssel in the summer 2017, he was officially announced as the new assistant manager of Danish 1st Division club AB. In January 2018, he left AB to become goalkeeper coach at Fremad Amager. In 2019, he also functioned as assistant manager for a short period.

On 15 July 2019, it was announced, that Christiansen had left Fremad Amager because he wanted to stay closer to his family and then became the new goalkeeper coach of Viborg. In November 2019, Christiansen was on the bench for Viborg in three games, after first keeper, Ellery Balcombe, was banned with a red card and the third and fourth choices was out with injuries, which left Viborg with only Ingvar Jónsson who was able to play. On 13 July 2020, Fremad Amager announced that Christiansen had returned to the club. He left Fremad Amager again in April 2022 as a protest against the club's new owners.

On 21 July 2022, Christiansen joined Nykøbing as a goalkeeper coach. In June 2023, Christiansn was appointed manager of Danish amateur club Vejby/Tisvilde Fodbold. It was the same club that Christiansen also played for a year earlier. He left his head coach position in October 2025.

In January 2026, Christiansen returned for his third spell at Fremad Amager, this time as an assistant coach under newly appointed manager John Bredal.

== Career statistics ==
Appearances and goals by club, season and competition
Club	Season	League			National cup		League cup		Continental		Total	
Club	Season	Division	Apps	Goals	Apps	Goals	Apps	Goals	Apps	Goals	Apps	Goals
RB 1906	1997–98	Danish 1st Division	0	0			0	0				
Ølstykke	1998–99	Danish 2nd Division	4	0			0	0				
OB	1998–99	Danish 1st Division	0	0			0	0				
OB	1999–00	Danish Superliga	0	0			0	0				
OB	2000–01	Danish Superliga	12	0			0	0				
OB	Total		12	0			0	0				
Rangers	2000–01	Scottish Premier League	3	0	0	0	1	0	2	0	6	0
Rangers	2001–02	Scottish Premier League	0	0	0	0	0	0	0	0	0	0
Rangers	2003–04	Scottish Premier League	0	0	0	0	0	0	0	0	0	0
Rangers	Total		3	0	0	0	1	0	2	0	6	0
Vejle B	2001–02	Danish Superliga	14	0	0	0	0	0	0	0	14	0
VfL Wolfsburg	2002–03	Bundesliga	0	0	0	0	0	0	0	0	0	0
Viborg	2003–04	Danish Superliga	13	0	1	0	0	0	0	0	14	0
Viborg	2004–05	Danish Superliga	33	0	1	0	0	0	0	0	34	0
Viborg	Total		46	0	2	0	0	0	0	0	48	0
Copenhagen	2005–06	Danish Superliga	33	0	1	0	1	0	14	0	49	0
Copenhagen	2006–07	Danish Superliga	33	0	5	0	0	0	18	0	56	0
Copenhagen	2007–08	Danish Superliga	32	0	3	0	0	0	10	0	45	0
Copenhagen	2008–09	Danish Superliga	31	0	3	0	0	0	11	0	45	0
Copenhagen	2009–10	Danish Superliga	11	0	0	0	0	0	5	0	16	0
Copenhagen	Total		140	0	12	0	1	0	58	0	211	0
Career total			215	0			2	0				

== Honours ==
OB

- Viasat Divisionen: 1998–99

Copenhagen

- Danish Superliga: 2005–06, 2006–07, 2008–09, 2009–10
- Danish Cup: 2008–09

Individual

- Danish Goalkeeper of the Year: 2005, 2006, 2007
- Danish Team of the Year: 2005, 2006, 2007
