= Weyland (surname) =

Weyland is a Germanic surname.

== People with the name ==
Notable people with the name include:

- Bernadette Weyland (born 1957), German politician
- Thomas Weyland (1230–1298), British justice
- Jacob Weyland (fl. 1705), Dutch explorer of the New Guinea coast who discovered Geelvink Bay
- Richard Weyland (1780–1864), British politician
- Joseph Weyland (1826–1894), German bishop
- Paul Weyland (1888–1972), German antisemitic conman and agitator who organized an anti-Einstein campaign
- Hermann Weyland (1888–1974), German botanist and chemist
- Otto P. Weyland (1903–1979), American Air Force General
- Marcel Weyland (1927–2025), Polish-Australian translator
- Jack Weyland (born 1940), American physicist and author
- Joseph Weyland (born 1943), Luxembourgish diplomat

== Fictional characters ==
- Cadmann Weyland, in science fiction novels The Legacy of Heorot and Beowulf's Children
- Charles Bishop Weyland, a character in Alien vs. Predator
- Peter Weyland, a character in Alien franchise
- R. H. Weyland, in the Death Race franchise
- Weyland Smith, a character from the Fables comic books

== See also ==
- Wayland, Weiland, Weyland, Weylandt, Wieland, Wiland, Willand, Wyland, Wielandt
