= Det Gyldne Bur =

Danish football award

- The Golden Cage
- Awarded for: Best goalkeeper in Danish football
- Sponsored by: Tipsbladet
- Country: Denmark
- Eligibility: Goalkeepers in Danish Superliga and Danish 1st Division
- Currently held by: Kamil Grabara
- Most awards: Lars Høgh (5)

Det Gyldne Bur (lit. 'the Golden Cage') is an award given to the best goalkeeper in Danish football each year. The winner is found by votes among the goalkeepers in the two top divisions of Danish football; the Danish Superliga and Danish 1st Division. The award has been handed out by Danish sports paper Tipsbladet since 1984.

== Recipients ==
Year	Winner	Club
1984	(Denmark) Ole Qvist	KB
1985	(Denmark) Troels Rasmussen	AGF Aarhus
1986	(Denmark) Lars Høgh	OB
1987	(Denmark) Peter Schmeichel	Brøndby
1988	(Denmark) Peter Schmeichel	Brøndby
1989	(Denmark) Lars Høgh	OB
1990	(Denmark) Peter Schmeichel	Brøndby
1991	(Denmark) Lars Høgh	OB
1992	(Denmark) Peter Schmeichel	Manchester United
1993	(Denmark) Lars Høgh	OB
1994	(Denmark) Lars Høgh	OB
1995	(Denmark) Lars Windfeld	AGF Aarhus
1996	(Denmark) Jørgen Nielsen	Hvidovre
1997	(Denmark) Erik Boye	Vejle
1998	(Denmark) Jimmy Nielsen	AaB
1999	(Denmark) Peter Kjær	Silkeborg
2000	(Poland) Arek Onyszko	Viborg
2001	(Morocco) Karim Zaza	OB
2002	(Morocco) Karim Zaza	OB
2003	(Morocco) Karim Zaza	Brøndby
2004	(Denmark) Jimmy Nielsen	AaB
2005	(Denmark) Jesper Christiansen	Copenhagen
2006	(Denmark) Jesper Christiansen	Copenhagen
2007	(Denmark) Jesper Christiansen	Copenhagen
2008	(Denmark) Stephan Andersen	Brøndby
2009	(Northern Ireland) Roy Carroll	OB
2010	(Sweden) Johan Wiland	Copenhagen
2011	(Sweden) Johan Wiland	Copenhagen
2012	(Denmark) Jesper Hansen	Nordsjælland
2013	(Finland) Lukas Hradecky	Brøndby
2014	(Denmark) Nicolai Larsen	AaB
2015	(Sweden) Karl-Johan Johnsson	Randers FC
2016	(Sweden) Robin Olsen	Copenhagen
2017	(Norway) Sten Grytebust	OB
2018	(Norway) Sten Grytebust	OB
2019	(Denmark) Jesper Hansen	Midtjylland FC
2020	(Sweden) Karl-Johan Johnsson	Copenhagen
2021	(Sweden) Jacob Rinne	AaB
2022	(Poland) Kamil Grabara	Copenhagen
2023	(Poland) Kamil Grabara	Copenhagen
