= Wayland (name) =

Wayland is a Germanic given name and a surname originating with Wayland the Smith, a legendary master blacksmith in Norse and Germanic mythology. He also gave rise to number of surnames, see "Wieland". Notable people with the name include:

== Given name ==
- Wayland Flowers (1939–1988), American puppeteer
- Wayland Young (1923–2009), British writer and SDP and Labour Party politician
- Wayland Becker (1910–1984), American football player
- Wayland Dean (1902–1930), Major League Baseball pitcher
- Wayland Drew (1932–1998), writer born in Oshawa, Ontario
- Wayland Hand (1907–1986), American folklorist
- Wayland Holyfield (born 1942), prominent American songwriter
- Wayland Hoyt (1838–1910), American Baptist minister and author
- Wayland Minot (1889–1957), American football player
- Wayland Maxfield Parrish (1887–1970), writer
- Wayland Tunley (1937–2012), British architect

== Surname ==
- Francis Wayland (1796–1865), American Baptist educationist and former president of Brown University
- John Wayland (1849–1890), President of the Chico Board of Trustees, the governing body of Chico, California from 1889 to 1890
- Julius Wayland (1854–1912), US socialist
- Sarah Wayland, Australian social worker and health researcher
- Susan Wayland (born 1980), German fashion model who features in adult photography
- Tom Wayland (born 1974), American voice actor
- April Halprin Wayland (born 1954), American children's and young adult author, poet, and teacher
- Hank Wayland (1906–1983), American swing jazz double-bassist
- Newton Wayland (1940–2013), American orchestral conductor, arranger, composer and keyboardist
- William Wayland (1869–1950), English Conservative Party politician

== See also ==
- Wayland, Weiland, Weyland, Weylandt, Wieland, Wiland, Willand, Wyland, Wielandt
