= Peter Kjær (footballer) =

Danish footballer (born 1965)

Personal information
- Date of birth: 5 November 1965 (age 60)
- Place of birth: Fredericia, Denmark
- Height: 1.88 m (6 ft 2 in)
- Position: Goalkeeper

Youth career
- Fredericia FF

Senior career*
Years	Team	Apps	(Gls)
1983–1993	Vejle Boldklub	163	(1)
1993–2001	Silkeborg IF	244	(2)
2001	Beşiktaş	6	(0)
2001–2003	Aberdeen	46	(0)
Total		459	(3)

International career
1986–1988	Denmark U-21	13	(0)
1994–2002	Denmark	4	(0)
Medal record
Men's football
Representing Denmark
FIFA Confederations Cup
Winner	1995 Saudi Arabia
- * Club domestic league appearances and goals

Peter Kjær (born 5 November 1965) is a Danish former professional footballer, current television commentator, and former sporting director of Silkeborg IF. During his active career as a goalkeeper, he played the bulk of his career with Danish clubs Vejle Boldklub and Silkeborg IF. He played for Turkish club Beşiktaş before ending his career with Aberdeen in Scotland, retiring in 2003. He played for the Denmark national team in four matches. With Silkeborg, he won the 1993–94 Danish Superliga championship and the 2001 Danish Cup, and was named the 1999 Danish Goalkeeper of the Year.

== Career ==
Born in Fredericia, he started his senior career at Vejle BK in 1983. He played a total 225 games and scored two goals for the club. He only played one game in the 1991–92 Danish Superliga season, serving as back-up for Boye Habekost, as Vejle were relegated to the Danish 1st Division. He played his last Vejle game in November 1992, before he joined Superliga club Silkeborg IF, making his debut for the team in March 1993. He played a total 291 games and scored two goals for Silkeborg, won the 1993–94 Danish Superliga championship and the 2001 Danish Cup with the team, and was named 1999 Danish Goalkeeper of the Year.

He had a brief stint in Turkey with Beşiktaş in 2001, under manager Christoph Daum. After two months at the club, Kjær was told by Daum that he contemplated leaving the club, and Kjær asked for his contract to be annulled. In October 2001, he was picked up by Danish manager Ebbe Skovdahl to join Scottish club Aberdeen. He stayed with the club until June 2003, after which he retired.

Kjær was included in the Denmark squads for the 1995 Intercontinental Cup, 1998 FIFA World Cup, Euro 2000 but he spent all three tournaments on the bench. He made his Denmark debut on 25 April 2001 in the farewell match of Peter Schmeichel. He was 35 years and 171 days old at the time, breaking the old record for oldest Danish debutant by 17 days, a record set by Johannes Gandil in 1908. He went on to play four international games until March 2002. He was included in the Danish squad for the 2002 FIFA World Cup, serving as a back-up to Thomas Sørensen.

After his retirement, Kjær was hired as a commentator and pundit for Danish TV 3 in August 2004. He was named sporting director of his former club Silkeborg IF in October 2008, and was in the job for nearly six months. He then went back to doing TV work.

== Honours ==
Silkeborg

- Danish Superliga: 1993–94
- UEFA Intertoto Cup: 1996
- Danish Cup: 2000–01
