= Weiland =

Weiland is a German surname. Notable people with the name include:

- Bob Weiland (1905–1988), American baseball player
- Cooney Weiland (1904–1985), Canadian ice hockey forward and coach
- Dennis Weiland (born 1974), German footballer
- Douglas Weiland (born 1954), British composer
- Ed Weiland (1914–1971), American baseball pitcher
- Hannah Weiland (born 1990), English fashion designer
- Julius Johann Weiland (ca. 1605 – 1663), German composer
- Kerry Weiland (born 1980), American ice hockey defenceman
- Kurt Weiland, Austrian Scientologist
- Kyle Weiland (born 1986), American baseball pitcher
- Niclas Weiland (born 1972), German footballer
- Paul Weiland (born 1953), English film and television director
- Rick Weiland (born 1958), American politician in South Dakota
- Ric Weiland (1953–2006), American computer software pioneer and philanthropist
- Scott Weiland (1967–2015), American musician, lyricist, and vocalist
- Thomas Weiland (born 1951), German engineer
- Weiland (musician) (born 2000), American rapper, singer, songwriter and music producer.

== See also ==
- Wayland, Weiland, Weyland, Weylandt, Wieland, Wiland, Willand, Wyland, Wielandt
