= Stephan Andersen =

Danish footballer (born 1981)

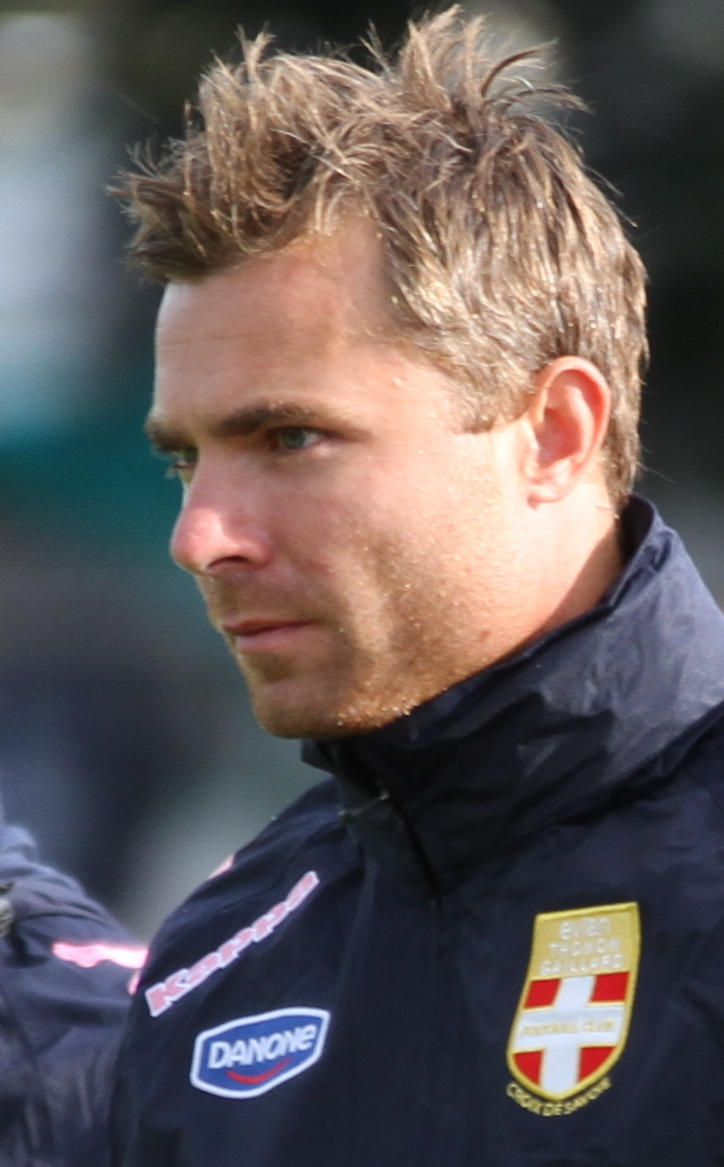
- In training with Evian.

Personal information
- Full name: Stephan Maigaard Andersen
- Date of birth: 26 November 1981 (age 44)
- Place of birth: Copenhagen, Denmark
- Height: 1.88 m (6 ft 2 in)
- Position: Goalkeeper

Youth career
- Brøndby
- Hvidovre

Senior career*
Years	Team	Apps	(Gls)
2000–2002	Hvidovre	45	(0)
2002–2004	AB	62	(0)
2004–2007	Charlton Athletic	17	(0)
2007–2011	Brøndby	137	(0)
2011–2013	Évian	35	(0)
2013–2014	Betis	7	(0)
2014	→ Go Ahead Eagles (loan)	13	(0)
2014–2021	Copenhagen	72	(0)
2021–2023	VB 1968	0	(0)

International career
2002	Denmark U20	5	(0)
2001–2003	Denmark U-21	21	(0)
2004–2015	Denmark	30	(0)
- * Club domestic league appearances and goals as of 15:55, 12 September 2021 (UTC)

Stephan Maigaard Andersen (born 26 November 1981) is a Danish former professional football player, who played as a goalkeeper. He was a full international for the Denmark national team and was chosen to represent his country at UEFA Euro 2004, the 2010 FIFA World Cup and UEFA Euro 2012.

== Club career ==
=== Early years ===
Starting his career at the youth teams of Hvidovre IF, he moved youth setup of multiple Danish champions Brøndby IF. When he was no longer seen as a long-term prospect for the Brøndby goalkeeping position, he left Brøndby in the winter 1999, to rejoin Hvidovre. Andersen made his senior debut for Hvidovre IF in the lower league Danish 1st Division, and was recognized as a big talent.

=== AB ===
In March 2002, Hvidovre owner, and professional goalkeeper, Peter Schmeichel chose to end his engagement in the club. Hvidovre actively sought to off-load Andersen, one of two professional players in the squad. He was initially wanted by a number of clubs in English football, including Schmeichel's club Aston Villa and Sunderland, the club of Danish international goalkeeper Thomas Sørensen. Sunderland opted to buy Norwegian international goalkeeper Thomas Myhre instead, and no other foreign offers materialized. Andersen moved to Akademisk Boldklub (AB) in the top-flight Danish Superliga championship in August 2002.

=== Charlton Athletic ===
He moved abroad to join English club Charlton Athletic in a DKK 8 million transfer deal in June 2004. In his first season with the London club, he only made two first team appearances. Due to an injury sustained by first choice goalkeeper Dean Kiely, Andersen started the 2005–06 season in the team. Charlton's poor mid-season form saw him dropped in favour of Kiely at first, then Thomas Myhre, who established himself as first choice as Charlton turned their season around. Andersen was reinstated into the lineup for the last two games of the season, when Myhre suffered an injury. In the 2006 summer transfer window, Andersen looked ready to join Leeds United on a season-long loan deal, but as Charlton insisted on a clause to allow the club to recall Andersen at any time during the season, the transfer fell through at the last moment. In the first half of the 2006–07 season, he saw the loaned-in Scott Carson become Charlton's starting goalkeeper.

=== Brøndby IF ===
In November 2006, Andersen signed a transfer deal to move back to Denmark to play for Superliga side Brøndby IF at the start of the January 2007 transfer window. He made some errors in his first time at the club, dropping against Odense Boldklub and Viborg FF, but was kept in the starting line-up and eventually upped his game. He helped Brøndby win the 2008 Danish Cup, and was named 2008 Danish Goalkeeper of the Year.

=== Later career ===
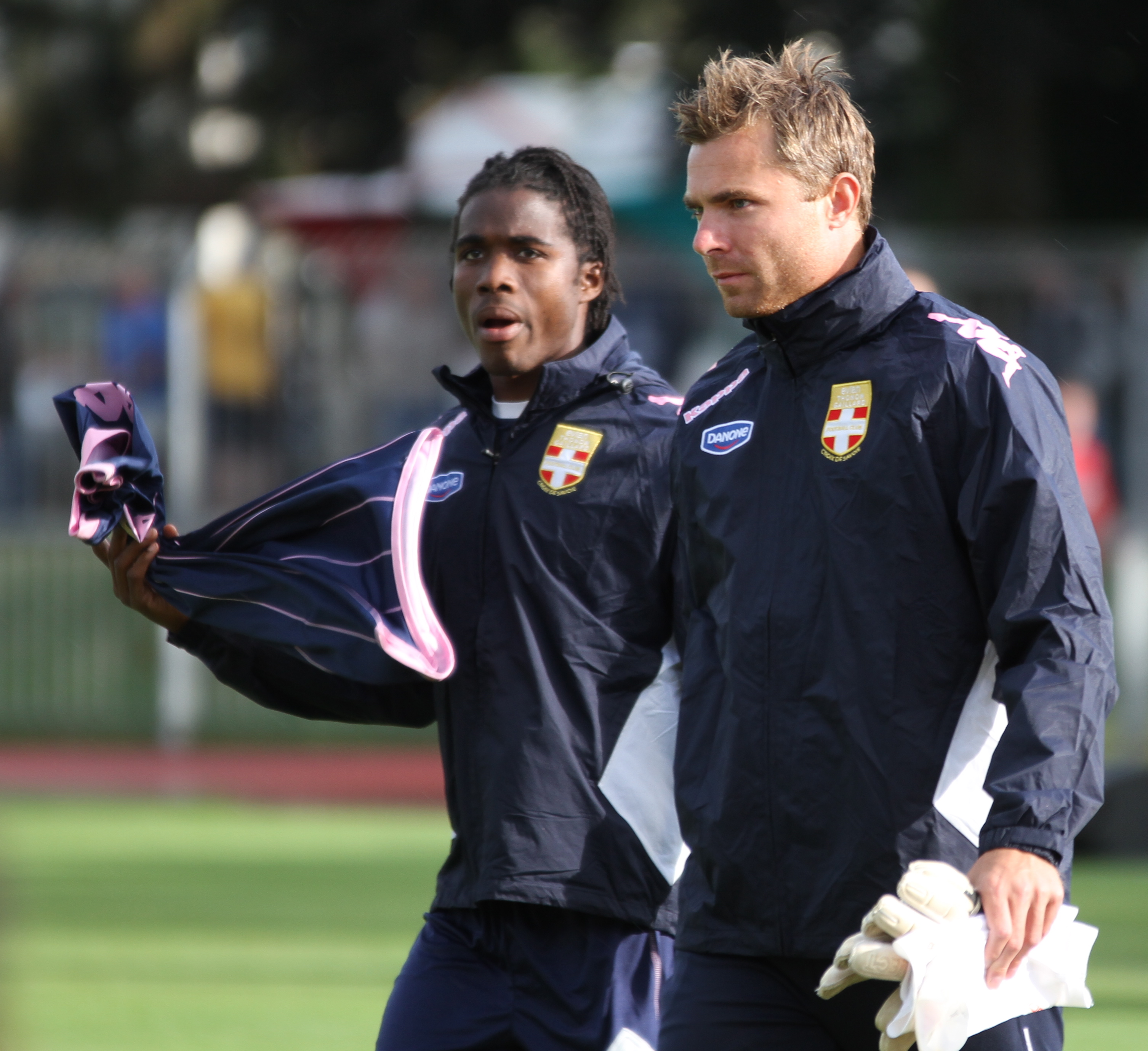
Andersen (right) training at Évian, 2012.

In August 2011 he joined former teammate Daniel Wass at Évian in the French Ligue 1 for a fee of DKK 2 million. In the summer of 2013 he signed a two-year contract with Real Betis of the Spanish La Liga. He was sent on loan to Dutch Eredivisie side Go Ahead Eagles on 30 January 2014 for the remainder of the 2013–14 season. On 19 May 2014, it was announced he would return to Denmark on a permanent deal, signing a three-year contract with Superliga side FC Copenhagen, the main rivals of his previous club Brøndby. On 17 June 2021, Copenhagen confirmed that he had left the club.

On 12 September 2021, Andersen joined Danish amateur club VB 1968.

== International career ==
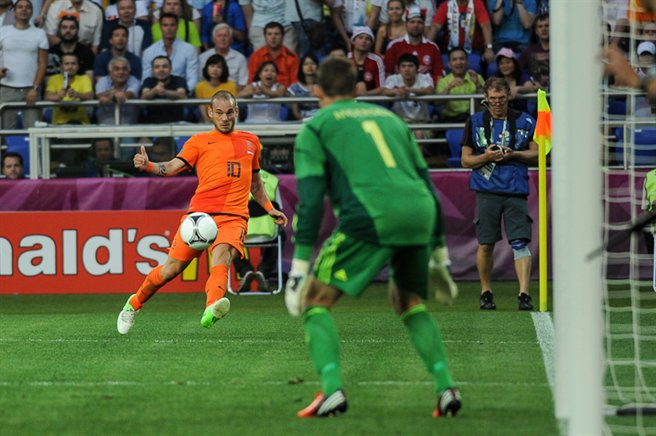
Andersen with Wesley Sneijder of the Netherlands at Euro 2012. He kept a clean sheet as Denmark won 1–0.

Andersen was called up for the Denmark under-21 national team in June 2001, where he immediately displaced the two-years older Rune Pedersen. While at AB, he reached 21 games for the Danish under-21 national team, and was the first goalkeeper to win a Danish talent award, when he was named 2003 Danish under-21 Talent of the Year.

Following strong displays for AB, Andersen made his Danish national team debut against Spain in a March 2004 friendly match. It would be four and a half years before he got his second cap. He was selected as a backup goalkeeper for the Denmark national team for the 2004 European Championship, where Thomas Sørensen was preferred as the starting goalkeeper in every game. While playing for Brøndby, Andersen got his second cap in September 2008, and replaced the injured Thomas Sørensen for three games in the 2010 FIFA World Cup qualification. He was included in the Denmark national team for the 2010 FIFA World Cuptournament. After the injured Thomas Sørensen was ruled out of UEFA Euro 2012, Andersen replaced him as the first-choice goalkeeper for the Danish national team.

== Career statistics ==
=== Club ===
Appearances and goals by club, season and competition
Club	Season	League			National cup		League cup		Europe		Total	
Club	Season	Division	Apps	Goals	Apps	Goals	Apps	Goals	Apps	Goals	Apps	Goals
Lyon	2002–03	Danish Superliga	30	0	0	0	—		—		30	0
Lyon	2003–04	Danish Superliga	32	0	0	0	—		—		32	0
Lyon	Total		62	0	0	0	—		—		62	0
Charlton Athletic	2004–05	Premier League	2	0	0	0	0	0	—		2	0
Charlton Athletic	2005–06	Premier League	15	0	0	0	1	0	—		16	0
Charlton Athletic	2006–07	Premier League	0	0	—		0	0	—		0	0
Charlton Athletic	Total		17	0	0	0	1	0	—		18	0
Brøndby	2006–07	Danish Superliga	15	0	—		—		—		15	0
Brøndby	2007–08	Danish Superliga	33	0	7	0	—		—		40	0
Brøndby	2008–09	Danish Superliga	33	0	3	0	—		6	0	42	0
Brøndby	2009–10	Danish Superliga	31	0	0	0	—		6	0	37	0
Brøndby	2010–11	Danish Superliga	21	0	0	0	—		6	0	27	0
Brøndby	2011–12	Danish Superliga	4	0	—		—		2	0	6	0
Brøndby	Total		137	0	10	0	—		20	0	167	0
Évian	2011–12	Ligue 1	30	0	3	0	0	0	—		33	0
Évian	2012–13	Ligue 1	9	0	0	0	0	0	—		9	0
Évian	Total		39	0	3	0	0	0	—		42	0
Real Betis	2013–14	La Liga	7	0	2	0	—		6	0	15	0
Go Ahead Eagles (loan)	2013–14	Eredivisie	13	0	—		—		—		13	0
Copenhagen	2014–15	Danish Superliga	33	0	4	0	—		10	0	47	0
Copenhagen	2015–16	Danish Superliga	17	0	0	0	—		4	0	21	0
Copenhagen	2016–17	Danish Superliga	3	0	4	0	—		1	0	8	0
Copenhagen	2017–18	Danish Superliga	13	0	2	0	—		1	0	16	0
Copenhagen	2018–19	Danish Superliga	6	0	1	0	—		8	0	15	0
Copenhagen	2019–20	Danish Superliga	0	0	0	0	—		0	0	0	0
Copenhagen	2020–21	Danish Superliga	0	0	0	0	—		0	0	0	0
Copenhagen	Total		72	0	11	0	—		24	0	107	0
Career total			307	0	26	0	1	0	44	0	378	0

=== International ===
Appearances and goals by national team and year
National team	Year	Apps	Goals
Denmark	2004	1	0
Denmark	2007	0	0
Denmark	2008	2	0
Denmark	2009	2	0
Denmark	2010	2	0
Denmark	2011	1	0
Denmark	2012	10	0
Denmark	2013	9	0
Denmark	2014	2	0
Denmark	2015	1	0
Total		30	0

== Honours ==
Brøndby IF

- Danish Cup: 2007–08
- Royal League: 2006-07

Copenhagen

- Danish Superliga: 2015–16, 2016–17, 2018–19
- Danish Cup: 2014–15, 2015–16, 2016–17

Individual

- Danish under-21 Talent of the Year: 2003
- Danish Goalkeeper of the Year: 2008
- Danish Cup Fighter: 2017
