= Wieland =

Wieland is a German surname and given name with several interpretations. Most common are: from wīg, 'war', and land/lant, 'land' and from reconstructed Old High German *wēla , *wiala, 'battle wave' and Old High German nand, 'bold'. Surnames with the same etymology: Wiland, Willand, Wyland,Weiland, Weyland, Weylandt. Wailandt, Wielandt, Wayland

== People with the given name ==
- Wieland Förster (born 1930), German sculptor and painter
- Wieland B. Huttner (born 1950), German physician
- Wieland Gevers (born 1937), South African academic
- Wieland Götze, German singer-songwriter and drummer
- Wieland Herzfelde (1896–1988), German publisher and writer
- Wieland Kuijken (born 1938), Belgian musician
- Wieland Schinnenburg, German politician
- Wieland Schmidt (born 1953), German handball player
- Wieland Schmied, Austrian art historian and critic, curator, literary scholar and writer
- Wieland Speck, German film director
- Wieland Wagner (1917–1966), German stage director and impresario, grandson of Richard Wagner

== People with the surname ==
- Alon Wieland (1935–2022), American businessman and politician
- Christoph Martin Wieland (1733–1813), German poet
- Heinrich Otto Wieland (1877–1957), Nobel Prize–winning German chemist
- Jan Müller-Wieland (born 1966), German composer
- Joe Wieland (born 1990), American baseball player
- Johann Wieland (born 1972), Austrian ski mountaineer
- Liza Wieland (born 1960), American novelist
- Melchior Wieland (c. 1520–1589), Prussian herbalist
- Paul Wieland (born 1962), American politician
- Rainer Wieland (born 1957), German politician
- Volker Wieland (born 1966), German economist
- Wolfgang Wieland (1948–2023), German lawyer and politician

== See also ==
- Wayland, Weiland, Weyland, Weylandt, Wieland, Wiland, Willand, Wyland, Wielandt
