= Wyland =

Wyland may refer to:

- Luke Wyland, American musician
- Mark Wyland (born 1946), American politician
- Ray O. Wyland (1890–1969), American educator
- Robert Wyland (born 1956), American painter
- Wendy Wyland (1964–2003), American diver

== See also ==
- Wayland, Weiland, Weyland, Weylandt, Wieland, Wiland, Willand, Wyland, Wielandt
