= Lars Høgh =

Danish footballer (1959–2021)

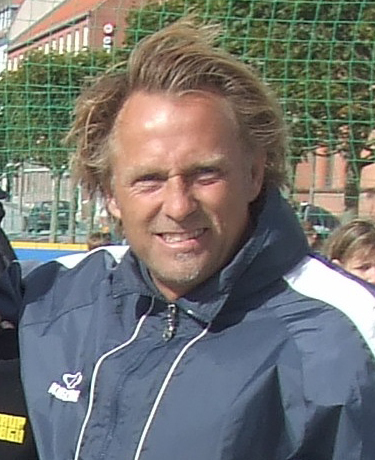
- Høgh in 2013

Personal information
- Full name: Poul Lars Høgh-Pedersen
- Date of birth: 14 January 1959
- Place of birth: Odense, Denmark
- Date of death: 8 December 2021 (aged 62)
- Place of death: Odense, Denmark
- Height: 1.80 m (5 ft 11 in)
- Position: Goalkeeper

Senior career*
Years	Team	Apps	(Gls)
1977–2000	OB	603	(0)

International career
1979–1983	Denmark U-21	3	(0)
1983–1995	Denmark	8	(0)

Managerial career
- 2003: FC Nordsjælland (goalkeeper coach)
- 2003–2004: AaB (goalkeeper coach)
- 2004–2007: Viborg FF (goalkeeper coach)
- 2007–2012: Brøndby IF (goalkeeper coach)
- 2007–2021: Denmark (goalkeeper coach)
- 2012–2016: OB (goalkeeper coach)
- 2016–2021: Brøndby IF (goalkeeper coach)
- * Club domestic league appearances and goals

Poul Lars Høgh-Pedersen (Danish pronunciation: [ˈhøːˀj]; 14 January 1959 – 8 December 2021) was a Danish footballer, who played his entire career as a goalkeeper for Odense BK. He won three Danish football championships and three Danish Cup trophies with OB, and won the Danish Best Goalkeeper of the Year award five times. He played eight matches for the Denmark national team, and was selected for the 1986 World Cup and 1996 European Championship squads. He was a part of the Danish team which won the 1995 King Fahd Cup.

Høgh owned his own goalkeeping company named Lars Høgh Coaching ApS. He trained countless goalkeepers in the Danish Superliga, both individually but also firmly attached to clubs in the league.

At the time of his death, he worked as a goalkeeping coach for Brøndby IF (2016–2021), and the Denmark national team (2007–2021).

From 2000 to 2003, Høgh worked as sports director for OB.

== Career ==
Born in Odense, Høgh started playing football with local club Odense Boldklub (OB). He made his senior debut in 1977 as an amateur (later to become semi-professional, and eventually full-time-professional), and was an understudy to Denmark national team goalkeeper Mogens Therkildsen, as OB won the 1977 Danish championship. The following years he established himself as OB's starting goalkeeper, and debuted for the Denmark under-21 national team in March 1979. He was a part of the OB team which won the 1982 Danish championship and 1983 Danish Cup, and was called up for the Denmark national team by national team manager Sepp Piontek. He made his national team debut in May 1983, and was a part of the Denmark team at the 1986 FIFA World Cup.

He started the World Cup as a substitute, but played in Denmark's last two matches at the tournament. Høgh replaced Troels Rasmussen as starting goalkeeper when Denmark beat West Germany 2–0 and advanced to the knock-out stage. In the round of 16 against Spain, Høgh conceded four goals to Spanish striker Emilio Butragueño, as Denmark lost 5–1 and was eliminated from the tournament. After the 1986 World Cup, Høgh was named 1986 Best Goalkeeper of the Year. Troels Rasmussen reclaimed his starting position in the national team, and Høgh played what would be his last match in the national team for eight years in September 1987. With the emergence of record-setting goalkeeper Peter Schmeichel, Høgh established himself as one of Schmeichel's most frequent understudies.

With OB, Høgh continued his consistent goalkeeping, and guided the team to another Danish championship in 1989, as well as Danish Cup triumphs in 1991 and 1993. He won the Best Goalkeeper of the Year award a further four times, setting a record five award wins in 1994. Høgh was a part of the Denmark national team at the 1995 King Fahd Cup, where he was Denmark's starting goalkeeper in the absence of Peter Schmeichel. In the second game of the tournament, Høgh suffered an injury, and was replaced by Mogens Krogh, who tended the goal as Denmark won the tournament.

== Later life and death ==
Høgh retired as a footballer in 2000, 41 years old, after an outstanding career with OB. He played his entire career with OB, for whom he played a total 817 matches from his debut in 1977, of which 603 were league matches. Following his retirement, Høgh served three years as sports director for Odense BK. He went on to become a footballing coach, both for individual goalkeepers, as well as clubs. In 2008, he replaced Jørgen Henriksen as coach for the goalkeepers of the national team of Denmark. He maintained this position and the same position for Brøndby IF until pancreatic cancer prevented him from doing so. He died from the disease on 8 December 2021, at the age of 62. A week before his death he had been included in the Danish Football Association's Hall of Fame.

== Honours ==
OB

- Danish championship: 1977, 1982, 1989
- Danish Cup: 1982–83, 1990–91, 1992–93

Denmark

- King Fahd Cup: 1995

Individual

- Danish Best Goalkeeper of the Year: 1986, 1989, 1991, 1993, 1994

== See also ==
- List of one-club men in football
