= Lars Windfeld =

Danish footballer (born 1962)

Personal information
- Date of birth: 3 October 1962 (age 64)
- Place of birth: Denmark
- Position: Goalkeeper

Senior career*
Years	Team	Apps	(Gls)
1993–2000	Aarhus Gymnastikforening	196	(1)
- * Club domestic league appearances and goals

Lars Windfeld (born 3 October 1962) is a Danish former professional footballer who played as a goalkeeper for Aarhus Gymnastikforening (AGF). He played a total of 221 games for AGF in all competitions, including 196 games in the Danish Superliga championship, and scored one goal against Odense BK in March 1995. He also won the 1996 Danish Cup with the club. He was named 1995 Danish Football Goalkeeper of the Year. He played for the Denmark national team in an unofficial match in August 1996.

Windfeld ended his active career in 2000 and became a businessman. In February 2005, he stepped in as CEO of AGF, and helped turn the financial hardships of the club into a small surplus. In November 2008, he went on an indefinite hiatus due to stress. The second half of 2008 turned out another economic loss for AGF, and in March 2009, Windfeld left the job in AGF. He subsequently came under police scrutiny, for the conduct of his private business ventures, but all charges were dropped within days.
