= Thomas Sørensen =

Danish footballer (born 1976)

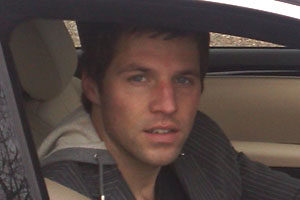
- Sørensen in 2007

Personal information
- Full name: Thomas Løvendahl Sørensen
- Date of birth: 12 June 1976 (age 50)
- Place of birth: Fredericia, Denmark
- Height: 1.96 m (6 ft 5 in)
- Position: Goalkeeper

Youth career
- Erritsø
- Assens
- OB

Senior career*
Years	Team	Apps	(Gls)
1993–1998	OB	0	(0)
1995–1997	→ Vejle (loan)	6	(0)
1997–1998	→ Svendborg (loan)	45	(0)
1998–2003	Sunderland	171	(0)
2003–2008	Aston Villa	139	(0)
2008–2015	Stoke City	99	(0)
2015–2017	Melbourne City	37	(0)
Total		497	(0)

International career
1993–1995	Denmark U19	3	(0)
1993–1997	Denmark U21	25	(0)
1996	Denmark B	1	(0)
1999–2012	Denmark	101	(0)
- * Club domestic league appearances and goals

Thomas Løvendahl Sørensen (Danish pronunciation: [ˈsɶɐ̯ˀn̩sn̩]; born 12 June 1976) is a Danish former professional footballer who played as a goalkeeper.

Sørensen started his career with his local side Odense BK. After impressing on loan at Vejle Boldklub and Svendborg he was signed by English side Sunderland in 1998. After five years as first-choice goalkeeper on Wearside, he joined Aston Villa for £2 million. He remained a regular for his time at Villa Park until a fall-out with manager Martin O'Neill saw him dropped and then released in May 2008. He then went to Stoke City, where he was first-choice goalkeeper for three seasons, helping the club consolidate in the Premier League. He then finished his playing career with a two-year spell at Australian club Melbourne City. He remains to date the Danish player with the most Premier League appearances (364 in total).

Between 2000 and 2012, Sørensen was the starting goalkeeper for the Denmark national football team, the successor to the legendary Peter Schmeichel, and he played 101 matches for his country, making him their eighth-most capped player of all time. He was part of Denmark's UEFA Euro 2000, 2002 FIFA World Cup, UEFA Euro 2004, and 2010 FIFA World Cup squads.

== Club career ==
=== Early career ===
Born in Fredericia, Sørensen started playing youth football with local clubs in Erritsø and Assens. He then moved to the youth team of local top-flight club Odense Boldklub. He played in training matches against FC St. Pauli and Werder Bremen in February 1993, and signed a trainee contract with the club. He was soon a professional with Odense BK's first team squad in the Danish Superliga championship. Sørensen served as an understudy to club legend goalkeeper Lars Høgh, and did not play any league games for the club.

During the 1995–96 season, he was loaned out to league rivals Vejle BK in December 1995. Initially an understudy to Erik Boye, he made his Superliga debut in March 1996. Sørensen played three thoroughly impressive games in a row, and the press dubbed him the new Peter Schmeichel. He played six league matches in all for Vejle, including a 6–0 defeat to Brøndby IF, before being dropped by coach Ole Fritsen following a 1–0 defeat to Viborg FF, in which Viborg's Ralf Pedersen headed the ball from Sørensen's hands to score the goal. Sørensen broke his arm in the summer 1996, but continued his loan deal with Vejle until the summer 1997, without playing any more games for the club. Odense then loaned him out again, this time to FC Svendborg in the second-tier Danish 1st Division league, where he played the full 1997–98 season.

=== Sunderland ===
In the summer 1998, Sørensen moved abroad to play for English club Sunderland in the Football League First Division, the then second level league of English football. Hardly anyone outside of Denmark had even heard of the tall and athletic keeper, when English manager Peter Reid bought the 22-year-old from Odense for about £510,000 in July 1998. He was recommended to the club by Peter Schmeichel. Sørensen was bought to replace fan favourite Lionel Pérez who left on a free transfer. This move helped Sunderland to promotion for the top flight English Premiership, when Sørensen and his team grabbed the League Championship title in 1999. Sørensen smashed the club's clean sheet record with 29 clean sheets in the process.

Sørensen established himself as Sunderland's starting goalkeeper in the Premiership, and helped the club finish 7th in both of their two first Premiership seasons. He gained legendary status with Sunderland fans in 2001, when he saved a penalty kick from Alan Shearer in the dying moments of a November 2000 game, to preserve a valuable win over archrivals and neighbouring club Newcastle United. In the 2002–03 season, Sørensen was injured from October 2002 to January 2003, and only played 21 of 38 games. Sunderland were struggling both on and off the pitch and Sørensen could not save the club from relegation at the end of the season.

Reid had already been sacked, and as a result of the club's mounting financial worries, Sunderland sold Sørensen for £2 million to Aston Villa, who had held off interest from a handful of other clubs, including Manchester United and Arsenal. He played nearly 200 games on Wearside for Sunderland and remains a fan favourite.

=== Aston Villa ===
At Aston Villa, Sørensen developed his reputation as a good goalkeeper. Sørensen's ability as a shot stopper allowed him to retain his place as Villa's number one under both managers David O'Leary and Martin O'Neill, ahead of the likes of Stefan Postma and Stuart Taylor. In his first three seasons at Aston Villa, he only missed four games. In a November 2003 game against Newcastle, he once again saved an Alan Shearer penalty kick. He suffered a knee injury during the 2006–07 season, but still played 29 games that term.

During the 2007–08 season he fell out of favour at Villa. Sørensen had suffered an injury during the pre-season, and Villa decided to loan in goalkeeper Scott Carson from Liverpool. Carson went on to become the starting goalkeeper, and Sørensen stated that he wanted to leave the club in December 2007. At the end of the 2007–08 season, Sørensen's contract at Villa expired and he left the club on a free transfer. He failed to make a single appearance for the club in his final season as by then he had slipped down to third place in the pecking order behind both Scott Carson and Stuart Taylor.

The author Lee Child is a fan of Aston Villa; In his 17th book in the Jack Reacher series, A Wanted Man (2012), the naming of the fictional characters, FBI agents Julia Sorenson and Karen Delfuenso are hidden references to players Sorenson and Nathan Delfouneso.

=== Stoke City ===
==== First-choice goalkeeper: 2008–2010 ====
On 28 July 2008, Sørensen started a trial with newly promoted Premier League team Stoke City, and two days later, he signed a three-year contract with the club. Sørensen became City's first choice goalkeeper for the 2008–09 season replacing Steve Simonsen. During a match in October 2008 against Tottenham Hotspur he was involved in a clash with Spurs's defender Alan Hutton whose challenge struck Sørensen on his head, Sørensen said he was close to losing his eyesight. Hutton later apologised for his challenge. He made a number of important performances as Stoke achieved in a safe position of 12th in their first season in the Premier League.

He continued to be Stoke's first choice goalkeeper in 2009–10 and signed a contract extension in November 2009, to keep him at the Britannia Stadium until 2011. During the 2009–10 season he continued his good form in goal. He saved penalties during games against Portsmouth, Arsenal and Wigan Athletic, and played an important part in Stoke's good run in the league, which brought them to 10th place in December. On 12 December Sørensen saved yet another penalty, meaning he had by then saved five out of the last six penalty kicks against him. Sørensen got extra competition for the spot as Stoke's first-choice goalkeeper, following the signing of Asmir Begović from Portsmouth in February 2010. He dislocated his elbow in a game against Chelsea on 25 April. The elbow was put back in place without the need for surgery, but Sørensen missed the last three games of the 2009–10 season.

==== Position challenged: 2010–2012 ====
After starting the first nine matches of the 2010–11 season Sørensen lost his place to Begović. However, he played in all the club's FA Cup games, including the FA Cup Final against Manchester City on 14 May 2011 where he put in a good performance despite Stoke City losing 1–0. For the 2011–12 season Sørensen remained as 2nd choice 'keeper to Begović where he played in cup matches as well as in the UEFA Europa League. After some poor performances by Begović, Sørensen was recalled to league matches. In a match against Everton he received mild concussion after a clash with Tim Cahill and had to be stretchered off. However he soon made a quick recovery. He signed a new two-and-a-half-year contract at Stoke in December 2011 keeping him at the club until 2014. After signing his new contract Sørensen stated that he wanted to continue playing top flight football after his contract ends.

==== Final years as back-up: 2012–2015 ====
In 2012–13 Sørensen was restricted to playing in just cup fixtures due to the form of Begović and this coupled with the signing of Jack Butland prompted Sørensen to consider his future at Stoke City. Following the departure of manager Tony Pulis, Sørensen planned to talk with new manager Mark Hughes about his future at the Britannia Stadium. Sørensen played his first Premier League game for over 20 months on 26 December 2013 at Newcastle United after Begović suffered an injury. However, despite him saving a penalty from Loïc Rémy, Stoke had two men sent-off and went on to lose 5–1. Sørensen started the next two matches before he himself was injured against Everton enabling third-choice Butland to fill in for Begović. Once Begović returned from his injury Butland was loaned out to Leeds United, leaving Sørensen to resume his place as back-up for the remainder of the 2013–14 season and was offered a one-year contract extension, which he signed in May 2014. In December 2014 Sørensen stated that he would leave Stoke at the end of the 2014–15 season. Sørensen received a special recognition award at the end of the season for his contribution to Stoke, in total he spent seven seasons at the Britannia Stadium making 129 appearances. Sørensen decided to mark his departure from Stoke by cycling 4,000 miles across the United States to raise money for charity.

=== Melbourne City ===
On 31 August 2015, Sørensen signed a two-year deal with Australian side Melbourne City. He made his A-League debut on 10 October in the first match of the new season away to Sydney FC in a 1–1 draw. Sørensen was released by Melbourne City in April 2017 after they lost their elimination-final to Perth Glory.

On 24 July 2017, Sørensen announced his retirement from professional football at the age of 41.

== International career ==
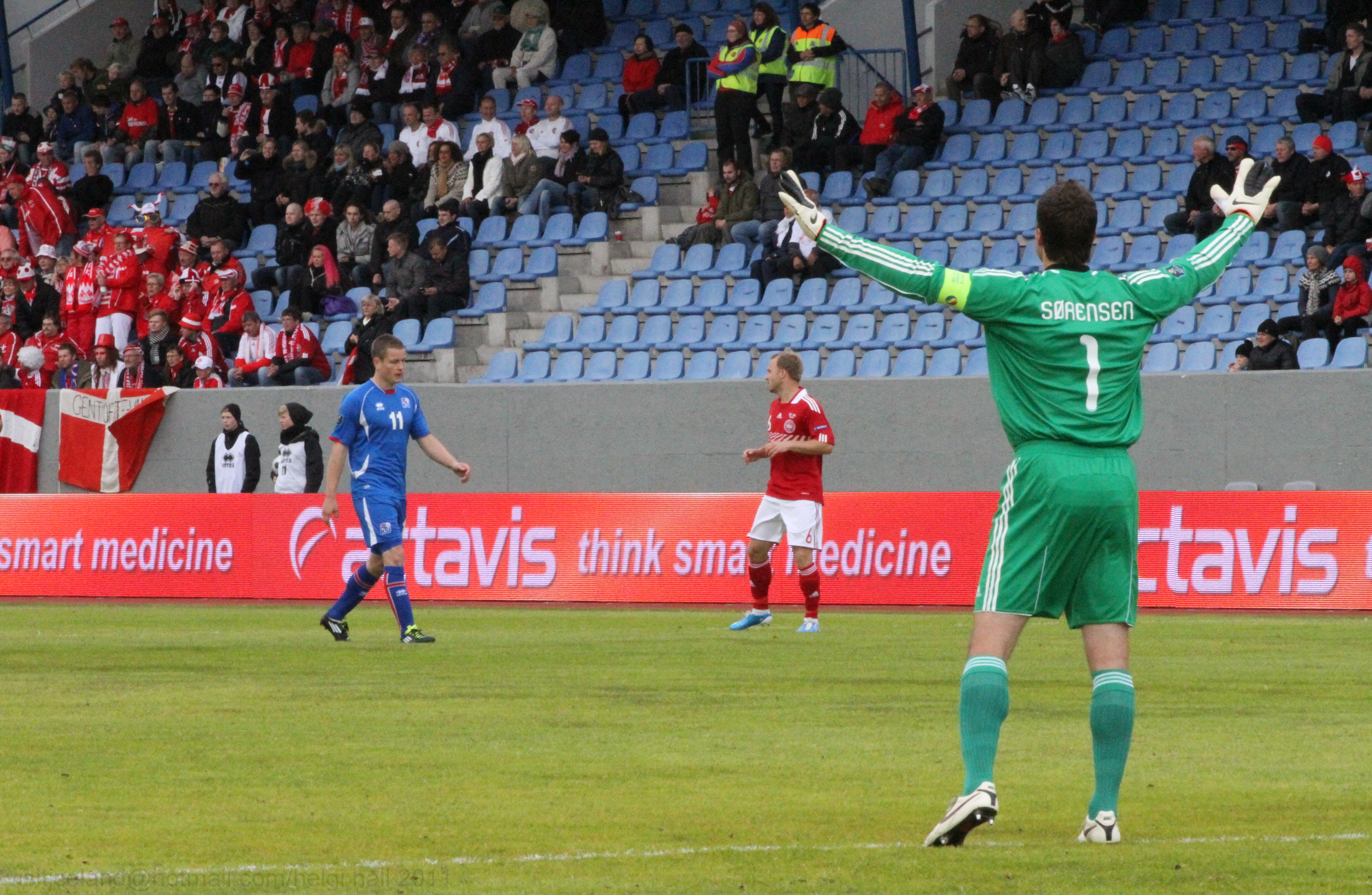
Sørensen in action for Denmark

Sørensen made his international debut with the Danish under-19 national team in April 1993, and was moved into the Danish under-21 national team in September 1993, making his under-21 debut at 17 years of age. He went on to play 24 games for the Denmark under-21s until October 1997. Following his initial impressive form for Vejle, he was called up for an unofficial national team game in April 1996, and replaced Lars Høgh at half-time.

After his move to Sunderland, Sørensen made his debut for the senior Danish national team in November 1999 in a match against Israel, coming on to replace an injured Peter Schmeichel. He was a reserve keeper for Denmark at Euro 2000, when Schmeichel was at the end of his career. For the 2002 FIFA World Cup qualifying campaign in 2001, he took over the job as goalkeeper and helped Denmark qualify. Sørensen was then instrumental, as Denmark won their first round group ahead of Senegal, Uruguay and defending World Cup champions France to book a second round clash against England. However, in the pouring rain at the Niigata Stadium, Sørensen conceded three goals, one of them a mistake by Sørensen, as he bundled the ball into his own goal from a Rio Ferdinand header in the fifth minute. England went on to win the match 3–0.

Once again representing his country in an international tournament, Sørensen played in all his country's games at Euro 2004, gathering the official man of the match award after both the 0–0 draw with Italy and the 2–0 victory against Bulgaria. Despite his efforts, Denmark was once more eliminated in a 3–0 loss, this time to the Czech Republic in the quarter-finals.

During the 2010 World Cup qualifiers, Denmark faced Sweden at Råsunda Stadium in Stockholm. Sweden was awarded a penalty in the tenth minute, which Sørensen saved as Denmark went on to win the game 1–0. Sørensen missed three qualification matches through injury, yet Denmark still qualified for the 2010 World Cup with one match to go. Sørensen's elbow injury put his chance of appearing in his second World Cup in doubt, but Denmark coach Morten Olsen included him in the final squad, and on regaining full fitness Sørensen was named the starting goalkeeper for his second World Cup campaign, and played full-time in Denmark's three games at the tournament.

He reached the landmark of 100 international caps at the age of 36 on 29 February 2012, in a 0–2 friendly defeat to Russia in Copenhagen. On 26 May, in a friendly against Brazil at Hamburg's Imtech Arena, Sørensen had to be substituted for an injury in the 24th minute which led to his withdrawal from Denmark's squad for UEFA Euro 2012.

On 7 August 2012, after making 101 appearances for Denmark, he announced his retirement from international football.

== Personal life ==
Sørensen grew up supporting Odense BK and cites Lars Høgh as his role model. He married Maria Borring in Svendborg, Denmark on 16 June 2001. Thomas and Maria have two children: Marcus and Celine.

In 2006, Sørensen became an investor in Golf Punk magazine, alongside former Sunderland teammates Phil Babb, Michael Gray, Jason McAteer, and Stephen Wright, saving the publication from closure.

Sørensen currently resides in Australia, where he has gained citizenship. He is a frequent panellist for Stan Sport’s streaming coverage of the English Premier League. Sørensen also actively appears as a guest on the network's 'GegenPod' podcast, providing punditry input to Australia's A-League, Socceroos national team fixtures and European leagues. He is also a regular panellist for the 'A-Leagues Download', a weekly review show produced by the Australian Professional Leagues. Additionally, Sørensen was present in covering UEFA Euro 2020 and Copa America 2021 fixtures, as well as the 2023 FIFA Women's World Cup, appearing as a panellist during pre and post game intervals.

== Career statistics ==
=== Club ===
Appearances and goals by club, season and competition
Club	Season	League			FA Cup		League Cup		Europe		Total	
Club	Season	Division	Apps	Goals	Apps	Goals	Apps	Goals	Apps	Goals	Apps	Goals
Odense BK	1994–95	Danish Superliga	0	0	0	0	—		—		0	0
Odense BK	1995–96	Danish Superliga	0	0	0	0	—		—		0	0
Odense BK	Total		0	0	0	0	—		—		0	0
Vejle (loan)	1995–96	Danish Superliga	6	0	0	0	—		—		6	0
Vejle (loan)	1996–97	Danish Superliga	0	0	0	0	—		—		0	0
Vejle (loan)	Total		6	0	0	0	—		—		6	0
Svendborg (loan)	1997–98	Danish 1st Division	45	0	0	0	—		—		45	0
Sunderland	1998–99	First Division	45	0	2	0	9	0	—		56	0
Sunderland	1999–2000	Premier League	37	0	2	0	0	0	—		39	0
Sunderland	2000–01	Premier League	34	0	4	0	4	0	—		42	0
Sunderland	2001–02	Premier League	34	0	1	0	0	0	—		35	0
Sunderland	2002–03	Premier League	21	0	4	0	0	0	—		25	0
Sunderland	Total		171	0	13	0	13	0	—		197	0
Aston Villa	2003–04	Premier League	38	0	1	0	6	0	—		45	0
Aston Villa	2004–05	Premier League	36	0	1	0	2	0	—		39	0
Aston Villa	2005–06	Premier League	36	0	4	0	3	0	—		43	0
Aston Villa	2006–07	Premier League	29	0	0	0	2	0	—		31	0
Aston Villa	2007–08	Premier League	0	0	0	0	0	0	—		0	0
Aston Villa	Total		139	0	6	0	13	0	—		158	0
Stoke City	2008–09	Premier League	36	0	0	0	0	0	—		36	0
Stoke City	2009–10	Premier League	33	0	5	0	0	0	—		38	0
Stoke City	2010–11	Premier League	10	0	7	0	0	0	—		17	0
Stoke City	2011–12	Premier League	16	0	1	0	2	0	7	0	26	0
Stoke City	2012–13	Premier League	0	0	3	0	1	0	—		4	0
Stoke City	2013–14	Premier League	4	0	0	0	4	0	—		8	0
Stoke City	2014–15	Premier League	0	0	0	0	0	0	—		0	0
Stoke City	Total		99	0	16	0	7	0	7	0	129	0
Melbourne City	2015–16	A-League	29	0	1	0	—		—		30	0
Melbourne City	2016–17	A-League	8	0	2	0	—		—		10	0
Melbourne City	Total		37	0	3	0	—		—		40	0
Career total			497	0	38	0	33	0	7	0	575	0

=== International ===
Appearances and goals by national team and year
National team	Year	Apps	Goals
Denmark	1999	1	0
Denmark	2000	1	0
Denmark	2001	8	0
Denmark	2002	11	0
Denmark	2003	10	0
Denmark	2004	12	0
Denmark	2005	10	0
Denmark	2006	6	0
Denmark	2007	11	0
Denmark	2008	6	0
Denmark	2009	9	0
Denmark	2010	6	0
Denmark	2011	8	0
Denmark	2012	2	0
Total		101	0

== Honours ==
Sunderland

- Football League First Division: 1998–99

Stoke City

- FA Cup runner-up: 2010–11

Melbourne City

- FFA Cup: 2016

Individual

- North East Football Writers' Player of the Year: 2001
- PFA A-League Team of the Season: 2015–16
- A-League Goalkeeper of the Year: 2015–16

== See also ==
- List of men's footballers with 100 or more international caps
