= Wayland Academy =

Wayland Academy may refer to:

- Wayland Academy, Watton, a secondary school in Watton, Norfolk, England
- Wayland Academy (Wisconsin), a private college preparatory school in Beaver Dam, Wisconsin, USA

== See also ==
- Wayland (disambiguation)
