= Peter Schmeichel =

Danish footballer (born 1963)

Peter Schmeichel MBE
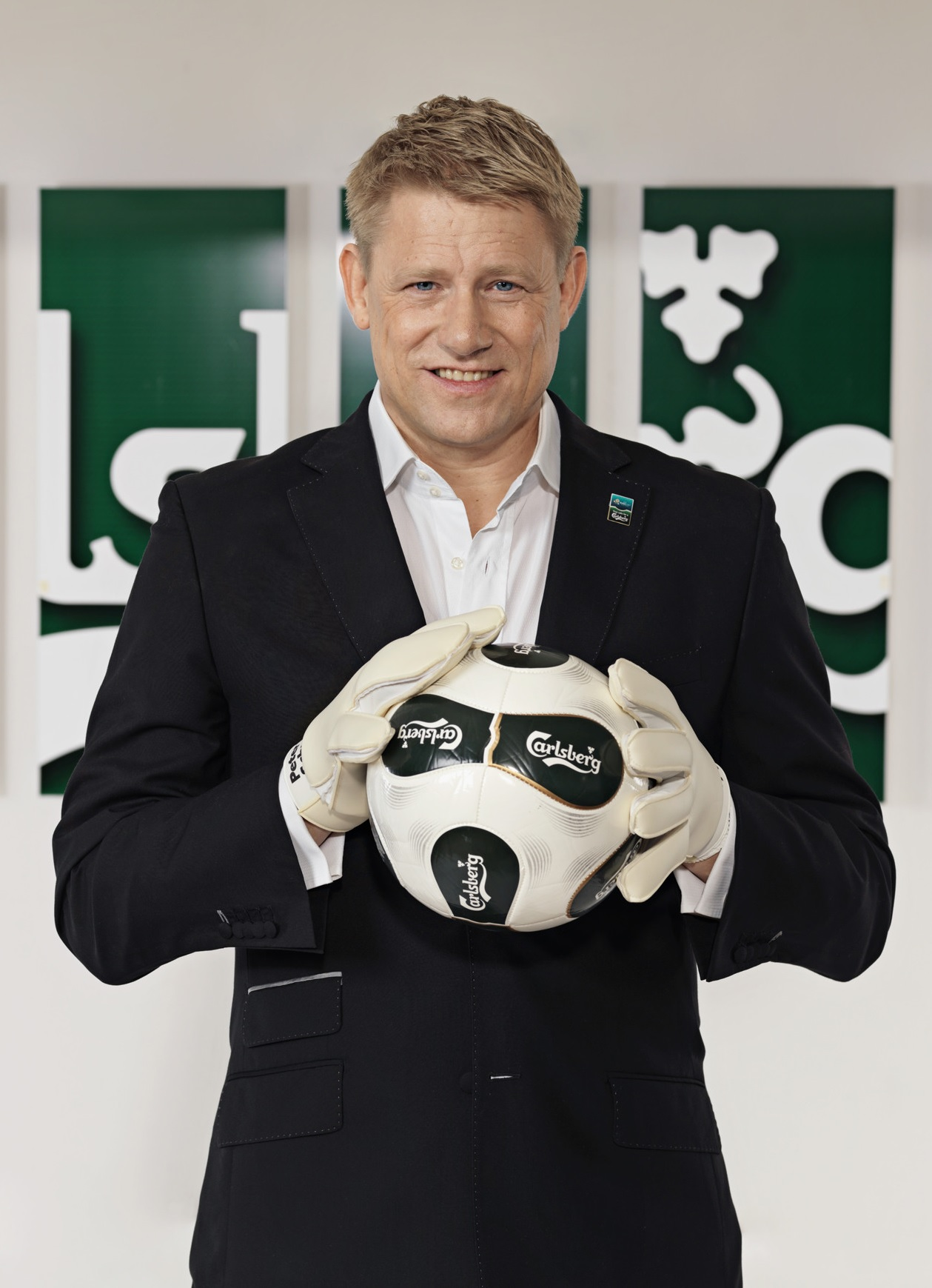
- Schmeichel in 2012

Personal information
- Full name: Peter Bolesław Schmeichel
- Date of birth: 18 November 1963 (age 62)
- Place of birth: Gladsaxe, Denmark
- Height: 1.93 m (6 ft 4 in)
- Position: Goalkeeper

Youth career
- 1972–1975: Høje-Gladsaxe
- 1975–1979: Hero
- 1979–1981: Gladsaxe-Hero

Senior career*
Years	Team	Apps	(Gls)
1981–1984	Gladsaxe-Hero	46	(0)
1984–1987	Hvidovre	78	(6)
1987–1991	Brøndby	119	(2)
1991–1999	Manchester United	292	(0)
1999–2001	Sporting CP	55	(0)
2001–2002	Aston Villa	29	(1)
2002–2003	Manchester City	29	(0)
Total		648	(9)

International career
1987–2001	Denmark	129	(1)
Medal record
Men's football
Representing Denmark
UEFA European Championship
Winner	1992
CONMEBOL–UEFA Cup of Champions
Runner-up	1993
- * Club domestic league appearances and goals

Peter Bolesław Schmeichel (born 18 November 1963) is a Danish former professional footballer who played as a goalkeeper. During eight seasons at English club Manchester United, he won 15 trophies including five Premier League titles, three FA Cups, and captaining the club to victory in the 1999 UEFA Champions League final to complete the treble. Schmeichel also played for the Denmark national team, with which he won the UEFA European Championship in 1992. Regarded as one of the greatest goalkeepers of all time, he was voted the IFFHS World's Best Goalkeeper in 1992 and 1993, while the International Federation of Football History & Statistics ranked Schmeichel among the top 10 goalkeepers of the 20th century.

Born in Gladsaxe, Copenhagen, Schmeichel is 1.93 m (6 ft 4 in) tall and weighed close to 100 kg (220 lb; 15 st 10 lb) during his playing days. A fierce competitor, he often loudly criticised perceived mistakes by his defenders. Unusually for a goalkeeper, he scored 11 goals during his career, including one for the national team. He was also the most capped player for Denmark, playing 129 games between 1987 and 2001, until he was overtaken by Simon Kjær in 2023. In addition to Euro 92, he played for his country at the 1998 FIFA World Cup and three more European Championship tournaments. He captained the national team in 30 matches. He also represented Gladsaxe-Hero, Hvidovre, Brøndby, Sporting CP, Aston Villa and Manchester City in a career that lasted from 1981 until 2003 and yielded 24 trophies.

When he retired, he was near to 1,000 career appearances.

In 2001, Schmeichel won a public poll held by Reuters, in which the majority of the 200,000 participants voted him as the best goalkeeper in history, ahead of Lev Yashin and Gordon Banks. In 2003, Schmeichel was inducted into the English Football Hall of Fame in recognition of his impact on the English game. In March 2004, he was named among the "125 greatest living footballers" on the FIFA 100 list. His son Kasper was also a professional goalkeeper, known for playing for Scottish side Celtic, the Premier League winning iteration of Leicester City and the Denmark national team.

== Early life ==
Peter Bolesław Schmeichel was born on 18 November 1963 in the Søborggård parish of Gladsaxe, Denmark, to Antoni Alexander "Tolek" Schmeichel (1933–2019), a Polish jazz musician, and Inger, a Danish nurse. He held Polish citizenship until November 1971 when he, his father, and his three sisters became Danish citizens.

Schmeichel inherited his middle name – Bolesław – from his great-grandfather. He spent his early years in the town of Buddinge, Copenhagen, and began his football career playing for a team in the adjacent suburb of Høje-Gladsaxe. His first match came on 7 August 1972 at the age of 8. After a two-and-a-half-year unbeaten run, Schmeichel was approached by BK Hero, a team from a few divisions above Høje-Gladsaxe and with one of the largest youth football schemes in Denmark. BK Hero merged with Gladsaxe BK in 1979 to form Gladsaxe-Hero BK, and Schmeichel was presented with the opportunity to play for the Zealand FA's junior representative team.

Before becoming a professional footballer, Schmeichel had to work a number of jobs to make ends meet. His first job came in the dyeing department of a textile factory, but safety concerns led to his resignation. He then spent 12 months as a cleaner at an old people's home, before taking up an office job with the World Wildlife Fund. He originally worked in the organisation's shops, but three weeks after he joined, the store manager left and Schmeichel was promoted to the position of sales manager. Soon after, Schmeichel was called upon to do his four months of compulsory military service. However, this coincided with Hvidovre's summer training camp in Portugal, which he was permitted to go on with the proviso that he completed his military service the following month. Nevertheless, the delicate organisational situation that arose between the WWF, the Danish defence department and Hvidovre prompted Schmeichel to give up working for the WWF. A job with his father-in-law's flooring firm came next, until he realised that his knees could not support his 15 stone (95 kg) frame for eight hours a day, and he was offered a job with the advertising firm owned by Hvidovre's chairman, Niels Erik Madsen. This was to be his last job outside football, as he was offered a contract with Brøndby the following spring.

== Club career ==
=== Early career: Gladsaxe-Hero and Hvidovre ===
Eventually graduating to the Gladsaxe-Hero senior squad, Schmeichel met his first mentor in Svend Aage Hansen, the first team coach at the club, and later to become his father-in-law. With Gladsaxe-Hero already relegated from the Danish third division with three games to go, Hansen promoted Schmeichel and six others from the youth team for a match against IF Skjold Birkerød. The team lost 1–0, but Schmeichel received mentions in local newspapers for his personal performance. At the end of the season, Hansen explained to Schmeichel his plan for the future, which involved Schmeichel spending two more seasons with Gladsaxe-Hero BK before moving on to Hvidovre (where he scored six league goals), playing for the Denmark national team, and eventually having a successful career abroad. Schmeichel admits that he had received an offer to play for B 1903's youth team, but he turned it down as the club "seemed a bit boring".

The following season, Gladsaxe-Hero needed only to avoid defeat to Stubbekøbing to prevent relegation from the Danish National League. In the end, Schmeichel played one of the best games of his career and Gladsaxe-Hero won the match. At the end of the game, Hansen's daughter, Bente, ran onto the pitch and hugged Schmeichel. The two ended up going out as a couple, and they eventually got married.

Despite having the fifth best defence in the league, conceding 40 goals in 30 games, Schmeichel and Hvidovre finished in 14th place and were relegated in 1985. After only a single season, the club bounced right back to the 1st Division, but Schmeichel left the club to join Brøndby.

=== Brøndby ===
Before the 1987 season, Schmeichel joined Brøndby, who finished as runners-up the previous season. In the five seasons that Schmeichel played with Brøndby, they went on to win the 1st Division four times. The climax of his Brøndby career would come in the 1990–91 UEFA Cup, which saw Schmeichel as an important part of the team that reached the semi-finals, keeping seven clean sheets in the competition. The club was eliminated from the tournament following a 2–1 away defeat to Roma with a last-minute goal by Rudi Völler. Schmeichel was voted 10th in "The World's Best Goalkeeper 1991" poll by the IFFHS.

=== Manchester United ===
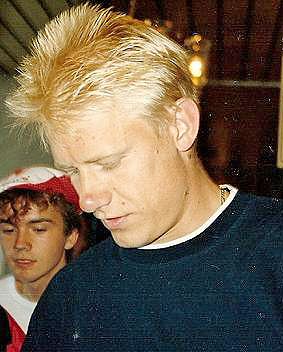
Schmeichel in July 1991, a few days after signing for Manchester United

Following his showings on the international scene, Manchester United signed Schmeichel on 6 August 1991 for £505,000, a price described in 2000 by Manchester United manager Alex Ferguson as the "bargain of the century." Schmeichel was virtually unknown outside Denmark at the time, especially within the United squad members. Manchester United finished as runners-up in Schmeichel's first season, and they also won the Football League Cup for the first time in the club's history. For his performances throughout the season, he was elected "The World's Best Goalkeeper of 1992" by IFFHS.

In the 1992–93 season, 22 clean sheets from Schmeichel helped United win the Premier League championship, the first time the club had won England's top trophy in 26 years. Schmeichel was once again named "The World's Best Goalkeeper" in 1993. In January 1994, Schmeichel fell out with Ferguson, as United had squandered a 3–0 lead to draw 3–3 with Liverpool. The two had a row where Schmeichel "said the most horrible things", and Ferguson considered selling him as a result. A few days later, Schmeichel apologised to his teammates for losing his temper. Ferguson overheard, and decided to retain Schmeichel. Schmeichel and United repeated the Premier League championship win at the end of the season, also capturing the FA Cup. United were denied a domestic treble by losing the 1994 League Cup Final to Aston Villa, a game for which Schmeichel was suspended.

Following a match against Arsenal in November 1996, Schmeichel was accused of racism by Ian Wright. During the game, Schmeichel and Wright had a number of controversies, and at the end of the game, the two players confronted each other on their way off the pitch. After the game, news emerged of a police inquiry into the incident, where it was alleged that Schmeichel had made a racist remark. In March 1997, the Crown Prosecution Service decided not to press any charges.

Schmeichel ended his Manchester United career on a high note, when the club won the Treble (the FA Premier League title, FA Cup and UEFA Champions League in the same season). In that year's FA Cup semi-final against Arsenal, Schmeichel saved a penalty kick by Dennis Bergkamp in the last minutes of the game (which Schmeichel revealed he was unaware of time), to send the game into extra time. In the absence of the suspended Roy Keane, he captained United in the UEFA Champions League final in May 1999. German opponents Bayern Munich had a 1–0 lead until the dying minutes of the game, when United received a corner kick. Schmeichel ran into the attack attempting to cause confusion, and Teddy Sheringham scored the equalising goal. A few seconds later, Ole Gunnar Solskjær scored the winner for United to ensure that Schmeichel's United career ended with a trophy win. Schmeichel cartwheeled gleefully in his area after Solskjær's winning goal.

With his departure, Manchester United had trouble finding a replacement for him, going through several high-profile goalkeepers including Mark Bosnich, Massimo Taibi, Fabien Barthez, Tim Howard and Roy Carroll, before finally buying Edwin van der Sar, who Alex Ferguson considered the best goalkeeper to have played for the club since Schmeichel.

=== Sporting CP ===
Schmeichel decided to leave English football at the end of the 1998–99 season, as the gruelling 60-game season, which came with playing with a successful club, was threatening to undermine his high standards at the age of 36. Seeking a slower pace of football, he moved to Sporting CP in Lisbon, where he signed a two-year contract. In his first season with the club, he won the 1999–2000 Primeira Liga title, putting an end to the team's 18 years without a championship. At the end of the 1999–2000 season, Schmeichel and Sporting CP agreed to terminate his contract with a free transfer back to Manchester United verbally agreed. However, Alex Ferguson called the deal off due to turning an eye to the "future", Fabien Barthez. The contract issue with Sporting CP was quickly resolved and he continued for a second season in Portugal.

His second year with Sporting was the first time in 14 years, since his Hvidovre days, that Schmeichel's club had finished below second place in the league. Schmeichel stated his wish to activate a contract option of a further year at Sporting in January 2001, but eventually decided to leave the club when his contract expired in June 2001.

=== Aston Villa ===
Schmeichel returned to England with Aston Villa in July 2001, signing a one-year contract with the option to extend it by a further year. On 20 October 2001, Schmeichel became the first goalkeeper to score a Premier League goal, in a 3–2 defeat away to Everton.

=== Manchester City ===
In 2002, Schmeichel moved to Manchester City on a free transfer. The move was described as a "shock" given his former allegiance to United, with manager Kevin Keegan stating he only needed 20 minutes to convince him to join City. During his only season with the club, City went unbeaten in the Manchester derby, meaning during his career he never was on the losing side; during his nine years with Manchester United, they were unbeaten against Manchester City, while in his single season with City, they won at Maine Road and drew at Old Trafford.

In the final derby to be played at Maine Road, caught live on television as the two teams were about to come out of the tunnel, United's Gary Neville refused to shake Schmeichel's hand before City went on to win the game 3–1. Speaking in 2018, Neville said "When you look back now and you're 43, like I am, there's two things about that. One, he left Man United at the age of whatever he was, 35, and he said he was retiring, basically to go abroad. At the time when he came back, he played for Manchester City. You can't play for Manchester City. I'm a United fan and I can't play for Manchester City, I can't play for Leeds and I can't play for Liverpool. That's just written in stone. You just don't play for those clubs, irrespective of what happens. He'd won the treble with United in '99, said that he was retiring...he should have carried on playing for United for the next two or three years if that was the case. We struggled for a keeper between Peter and Edwin."

Schmeichel announced his retirement from football in April 2003, with City replacing him with fellow veteran keeper David Seaman.

== International career ==
Schmeichel made his debut for the Denmark national team in May 1987, under national manager Sepp Piontek, and was selected for UEFA Euro 1988, where he eventually became Denmark's starting goalkeeper, after initially serving as a back-up to Troels Rasmussen in Denmark's opening 3–2 defeat to Spain; Denmark lost both of their remaining two matches 2–0 to West Germany and Italy, however, and were eliminated in the first round of the competition.

Under new national manager Richard Møller Nielsen, Schmeichel was Denmark's starting goalkeeper at UEFA Euro 1992, which they went on to win. Although Denmark initially finished behind Yugoslavia in their qualification campaign for the final tournament, the latter nation were banned from the competition, while Denmark replaced them in the finals. Schmeichel made a string of important saves during the tournament, keeping a clean sheet in Denmark's opening 0–0 draw against England, and producing decisive stops against Eric Cantona and Jean-Pierre Papin in a 2–1 win over France to advance to the last four. In the semi-finals against defending champions the Netherlands, following a 2–2 draw after extra time, he stopped a penalty kick from Marco van Basten – the only miss of the shoot-out – which meant Denmark advanced to the final in a 5–4 shootout victory. Schmeichel also made several decisive saves in the final, and even held a cross with one hand, keeping a clean sheet in his nation's 2–0 victory over Germany.

In November 1993, Schmeichel and Denmark failed to qualify for the 1994 FIFA World Cup in the United States, as they were tied on points and goal difference with the Republic of Ireland, and went out on goals scored. Schmeichel played for Denmark at Euro 96, hosted by England. The defending European Champions went out in the preliminary group stage, despite delivering results equivalent to the Euro 92 tournament in the first round. Under national manager Bo Johansson, Schmeichel was a part of the Danish squad at the 1998 FIFA World Cup, during which he overtook Morten Olsen as the most-capped player for Denmark. He was one of the leading members of the Danish campaign, which ended in a 3–2 quarter-final defeat to Brazil.

He scored his only goal for the Danish national team, a penalty kick in a 2–2 draw against Belgium, in a June 2000 warm-up match for Euro 2000. He represented Denmark at Euro 2000, where the team was eliminated in the group stage. He announced his retirement from the national team in February 2001, and played his final match (his 129th international appearance) two months later, captaining the side in a 3–0 friendly win over Slovenia at Copenhagen's Parken Stadium; he was substituted in the 65th minute to a standing ovation, replaced by long-time back-up Peter Kjær. He kept a clean sheet in the match.

== Style of play ==
Schmeichel has been described by pundits, as well as both former and current goalkeeping colleagues as one of the greatest goalkeepers of all time, and also as Denmark's greatest goalkeeper ever. (Note: See) (Note: See) A physically imposing goalkeeper, with a large frame and long reach, as well as quick reflexes, he was also athletic and agile for a player of his size, (Note: See) and was known for his ability to cover the goal with his trademark "star jump" saves, a technique he reportedly developed from playing handball.

He was highly regarded for his goalkeeping technique, shot-stopping ability, and positioning between the posts, as well as his command of his area, handling, and ability to rush off his line both in one on one situations or when coming out to claim crosses. (Note: See) A courageous and fierce competitor, he was a vocal presence in goal, known for his strong character, mentality, ability to organise his defence, and leadership from the back, as well as for his criticism of his defenders whenever they made mistakes. (Note: See) He was also effective at stopping penalties. In addition to his goalkeeping ability, he was also known for his capacity to read the game, as well as his adeptness with the ball at his feet, and his distribution and ability to launch swift counter-attacks with his long and accurate throws and kicks. Unusually for a goalkeeper, he would often go up for corner kicks in the opposition's area when his team were trailing, and scored 11 goals in his career. (Note: See) An example of this was when he was playing for Manchester United in a UEFA Cup match against Rotor Volgograd at Old Trafford in September 1995. He scored in the last minutes of the game to tie the match 2–2, though United were eliminated from the tournament on the away goals rule.

== Later career ==
In December 1999, Schmeichel became the owner of his childhood club Hvidovre IF, before later withdrawing from the club in June 2002, admitting he had gone into business too early.

Schmeichel worked as a pundit for the BBC after retiring, being a regular analyst on Match of the Day until 2005. He then began hosting live UEFA Champions League matches on Danish television channel TV3+, with Preben Elkjær and Brian Laudrup the studio pundits. However, he still works occasionally as a pundit for the BBC. He's worked for American television broadcaster CBS Sports on their UEFA Champions League coverage since 2021.

He also took part in Soccer Aid, and played for the Rest of the World team, who lost 2–1 after he was substituted at half-time. Schmeichel was a contestant on the 2006 series of the BBC's popular Saturday night TV programme Strictly Come Dancing, but was voted out by the public on his 43rd birthday. He also appeared on The Weakest Link in the UK, but he was voted off as the weakest link in the first round.

On 31 August 2007, an investor group including Schmeichel announced their intention to invest DKK 250 million (€33.5 million) in the football club Brøndby IF and make him sports director. This was announced in a press conference in Danish at a hotel in Copenhagen. The offer fell through when Brøndby failed to accept the offer within the group's deadline.

In February 2007, he became the host in a new quiz, on TV3 named 1 mod 100 (the Danish version of 1 vs. 100). In 2008, he became the host of the European version of the Discovery Channel programme, Dirty Jobs.

== Personal life ==
Schmeichel was divorced from his wife Bente Schmeichel in 2013. He remarried again in 2019 to Playboy model Laura Von Lindholm.

Bente Schmeichel is the mother of his two children, Cecilie Schmeichel and Kasper Schmeichel, a former goalkeeper for Leicester City and the Denmark national team since 2013 up until 2026.

Schmeichel plays the piano as a hobby and joined Robbie Williams onstage during his 2006 Close Encounters Tour at Copenhagen's Parken Stadium to play the keyboards during "Feel".

=== Criticism of sportswashing and FIFA support ===
In 2018, Schmeichel hosted a series of programmes produced by the state-owned Russian television station RT. They took the form of a mixture of football and travel reports, on the occasion of the World Cup in football in the country. He has been criticised for participating in sportswashing, by receiving money to promote World Cup hosts Russia and Qatar. In addition, he is a supporter of an unpopular FIFA proposal that the World Cup be held every two years.

== Career statistics ==
=== Club ===
Appearances and goals by club, season and competition
Club	Season	League			National cup		League cup		Continental		Other		Total	
Club	Season	Division	Apps	Goals	Apps	Goals	Apps	Goals	Apps	Goals	Apps	Goals	Apps	Goals
Hvidovre	1984	Danish 1st Division	20	0			—		—		—		20	0
Hvidovre	1985	Danish 1st Division	28	6			—		—		—		28	6
Hvidovre	1986	Danish 2nd Division	30	0			—		—		—		30	0
Hvidovre	Total		78	6			—		—		—		78	6
Brøndby	1987	Danish 1st Division	23	2			—		2	0	—		25	2
Brøndby	1988	Danish 1st Division	26	0			—		4	0	—		30	0
Brøndby	1989	Danish 1st Division	26	0			—		2	0	—		28	0
Brøndby	1990	Danish 1st Division	26	0			—		2	0	—		28	0
Brøndby	1991	Danish Superliga	18	0			—		10	0	—		28	0
Brøndby	Total		119	2			—		20	0	—		139	2
Manchester United	1991–92	First Division	40	0	3	0	6	0	3	0	1	0	53	0
Manchester United	1992–93	Premier League	42	0	3	0	2	0	1	0	—		48	0
Manchester United	1993–94	Premier League	40	0	7	0	8	0	4	0	1	0	60	0
Manchester United	1994–95	Premier League	32	0	7	0	0	0	3	0	1	0	43	0
Manchester United	1995–96	Premier League	36	0	6	0	1	0	2	1	—		45	1
Manchester United	1996–97	Premier League	36	0	3	0	0	0	9	0	1	0	49	0
Manchester United	1997–98	Premier League	32	0	4	0	0	0	7	0	1	0	44	0
Manchester United	1998–99	Premier League	34	0	8	0	0	0	13	0	1	0	56	0
Manchester United	Total		292	0	41	0	17	0	42	1	6	0	398	1
Sporting CP	1999–2000	Primeira Liga	28	0	2	0	—		2	0	—		32	0
Sporting CP	2000–01	Primeira Liga	27	0	0	0	—		4	0	3	0	34	0
Sporting CP	Total		55	0	2	0	—		6	0	3	0	66	0
Aston Villa	2001–02	Premier League	29	1	1	0	2	0	4	0	—		36	1
Manchester City	2002–03	Premier League	29	0	1	0	1	0	—		—		31	0
Career total			602	9	45	0	20	0	72	1	9	0	748	10

=== International ===
Appearances and goals by national team and year
National team	Year	Apps	Goals
Denmark	1987	5	0
Denmark	1988	11	0
Denmark	1989	12	0
Denmark	1990	10	0
Denmark	1991	7	0
Denmark	1992	12	0
Denmark	1993	9	0
Denmark	1994	7	0
Denmark	1995	8	0
Denmark	1996	10	0
Denmark	1997	6	0
Denmark	1998	10	0
Denmark	1999	11	0
Denmark	2000	10	1
Denmark	2001	1	0
Total		129	1

Score and result list Denmark's goal tally first, score column indicates score after Schmeichel goal.

International goal scored by Peter Schmeichel
No.	Date	Venue	Opponent	Score	Result	Competition
1	3 June 2000	Parken Stadium, Copenhagen, Denmark	Belgium	2–1	2–2	Friendly

== Honours ==
Brøndby

- Danish 1st Division/Danish Superliga: 1987, 1988, 1990, 1991
- Danish Cup: 1988–89

Manchester United

- Premier League: 1992–93, 1993–94, 1995–96, 1996–97, 1998–99
- FA Cup: 1993–94, 1995–96, 1998–99
- Football League Cup: 1991–92
- FA Charity Shield: 1993, 1994, 1996, 1997
- UEFA Champions League: 1998–99
- European Super Cup: 1991

Sporting CP

- Primeira Liga: 1999–2000
- Supertaça Cândido de Oliveira: 2000

Aston Villa

- UEFA Intertoto Cup: 2001

Denmark

- UEFA European Championship: 1992

Individual

- Det Gyldne Bur (Goalkeeper of the Year in the Danish League): 1987, 1988, 1990, 1992
- Danish Football Player of the Year: 1990, 1993, 1999
- UEFA European Championship Team of the Tournament: 1992
- UEFA Goalkeeper of the Year: 1992, 1993, 1998
- IFFHS World's Best Goalkeeper: 1992, 1993
- PFA Team of the Year: 1992–93 Premier League
- Premier League Player of the Season: 1995–96
- UEFA Club Goalkeeper of the Year: 1997–98
- UEFA Champions League 10 Seasons Dream Team (1992 to 2002): 2002
- English Football Hall of Fame: 2003
- PFA England League Team of the Century (1907 to 2007): 2007
- Most clean sheets in the Premier League: 1994–95, 1995–96, 1997–98
- Premier League Hall of Fame: 2022
- Premier League 10 Seasons Awards (1992–93 to 2001–02):
  - Overseas and overall Team of the Decade
  - Save of the Decade (vs. Newcastle, 21 December 1997)
- Premier League 20 Seasons Awards (1992–93 to 2011–12):
  - Fantasy Teams of the 20 Seasons public and panel choice
- FIFA 100
- Danish Football Hall of Fame
- World Soccer: The 100 Greatest Footballers of All Time
- Football League 100 Legends

Orders

- Honorary Member of the Order of the British Empire (MBE): 2001

== Published works ==
- Schmeichel, Peter (2000) [1999]. Schmeichel: The Autobiography (2nd ed.). London: Virgin Publishing. ISBN 0-7535-0444-8.
- Schmeichel, Peter (2021) [2021]. One: My Autobiography (1st ed.). London: Hodder & Stoughton. ISBN 9781529354096.

== See also ==
- List of men's footballers with 100 or more international caps
- List of goalscoring goalkeepers
- List of Danish sportspeople
