= Karim Zaza =

Moroccan footballer (born 1975)

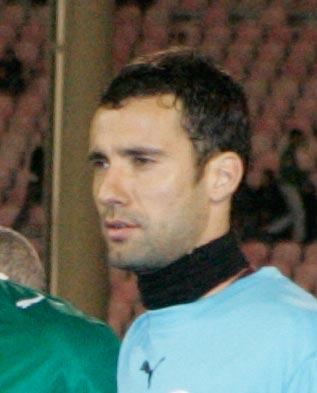
- Zaza in 2009

Personal information
- Date of birth: 9 January 1975 (age 51)
- Place of birth: Brøndby, Denmark
- Height: 1.85 m (6 ft 1 in)
- Position: Goalkeeper

Youth career
- Brøndby

Senior career*
Years	Team	Apps	(Gls)
1995–2000	Copenhagen	80	(0)
2000	→ Fremad Amager (loan)	1	(0)
2000	→ Silkeborg (loan)	0	(0)
2000–2003	OB	79	(0)
2003–2006	Brøndby	49	(0)
2006–2007	Rot-Weiss Essen	31	(0)
2007–2011	AaB	100	(0)
2011–2014	Vendsyssel	72	(1)
Total		412	(1)

International career
2000–2009	Morocco	5	(0)

Managerial career
- 2014–2015: Lekhwiya (goalkeeper coach)
- 2016–2017: Vendsyssel (assistant)
- 2017–2020: Vendsyssel (goalkeeper coach)
- 2020: Al-Duhail (goalkeeper coach)
- 2021: Vejle (goalkeeper coach)
- 2021–2024: Vendsyssel (goalkeeper coach)
- * Club domestic league appearances and goals

Karim Zaza (Danish pronunciation: [kʰɑˈʁim ˈsɑsɑ], Arabic: كريم زازا; born 9 January 1975) is a former professional footballer.

Born in Denmark, he established himself as one of the top goalkeepers of Danish football with three consecutive Danish Goalkeeper of the Year awards from 2001 to 2003. He won the Danish Cup twice with F.C. Copenhagen, once with Odense Boldklub (OB) and the Double with Brøndby IF, as well as another Danish championship with AaB in 2008. He played five games for the Morocco national football team.

== Club career ==
On 21 March 2010, Zaza played his 100th game for AaB in all competitions.

Zaza ended his career at the Danish 1st Division side Vendsyssel FF, retiring in the Summer of 2014, after a knee injury that prevented him from playing.

== Coaching career ==
After his retirement in 2014, Zaza was immediately hired as a goalkeeper coach under Michael Laudrup of Lekhwiya SC in Qatar. Laudrup and his staff, including Zaza, left the club in June 2015. In July 2016, Zaza returned to Vendsyssel FF as an assistant manager under Joakim Mattsson. In early January 2017, Zaza was offered to continue at the club as a goalkeeper coach instead of assistant manager, which he accepted. He left Vendsyssel in January 2020 and returned to Lekhwiya SC in Qatar, which since the last time had been renamed as Al-Duhail SC. He left Qatar in October 2020.

On 1 March 2021, Zaza was appointed goalkeeper coach of Vejle Boldklub on a deal for the rest of the season. On 20 July 2021, Zaza returned to Vendsyssel FF. On December 6, 2024, Vendsyssel confirmed that Zaza would not continue at the club after the winter break.

== Honours ==
Copenhagen

- Danish Cup: 1994–95, 1996–97
- Danish Super Cup: 1995

OB

- Danish Cup: 2001–02

Brøndby

- Danish Superliga^{(I)}: 2004–05
- Danish Cup: 2004–05

AaB

- Danish Superliga^{(I)}: 2007–08

Individual

- Danish Goalkeeper of the Year: 2001, 2002, 2003
