= Anders Bogsjö =

Swedish footballer

Personal information
- Date of birth: 16 June 1966 (age 60)
- Place of birth: Borås, Sweden
- Height: 1.96 m (6 ft 5 in)
- Position: Goalkeeper

Senior career*
Years	Team	Apps	(Gls)
1983–2001	IF Elfsborg	103	(0)
2002–2004	Mariedals IK	118	(0)

International career
1986	Sweden U21	1	(0)
- * Club domestic league appearances and goals

Anders Bogsjö (born 16 June 1966) is a Swedish retired football goalkeeper.

He joined IF Elfsborg in 1983 and made the first team in 1985. Upon their relegation from Allsvenskan in 1987 he was the club's first-choice goalkeeper the next season, and remained so until hanging up his boots in 1991 to become a physiotherapist.

In 1995 he returned to football and rejoined IF Elfsborg. In 1997 Bogsjö was nominated for Goalkeeper of the Year at Fotbollsgalan. In 2001, he played out the rest of his career at Mariedals IK, his boyhood club.

After leaving football he became a chemistry and engineering teacher. In 2008, he appeared as a contestant on Postkodmiljonären, winning 10,000 kr. He is a supporter of Stoke City in English football.
