= Roy Carroll =

Northern Irish professional footballer (born 1977)

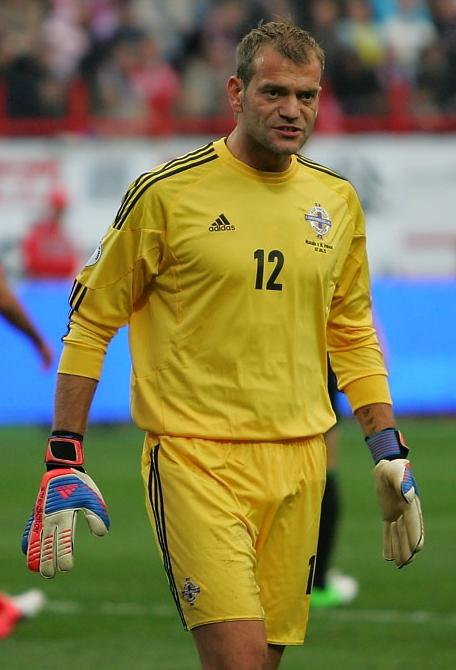
- Carroll playing for Northern Ireland in 2012

Personal information
- Full name: Roy Eric Carroll
- Date of birth: 30 September 1977 (age 49)
- Place of birth: Enniskillen, Northern Ireland
- Height: 6 ft 2 in (1.88 m)
- Position: Goalkeeper

Youth career
- Fivemiletown United
- 19??–1995: Ballinamallard United

Senior career*
Years	Team	Apps	(Gls)
1995–1997	Hull City	46	(0)
1997–2001	Wigan Athletic	138	(0)
2001–2005	Manchester United	49	(0)
2005–2007	West Ham United	31	(0)
2007–2008	Rangers	0	(0)
2008–2009	Derby County	30	(0)
2009–2011	Odense BK	46	(0)
2011–2012	OFI	16	(0)
2012–2014	Olympiacos	19	(0)
2014–2016	Notts County	77	(0)
2016–2019	Linfield	88	(0)
2019–2021	FC Mindwell		
2021	Dungannon Swifts	18	(0)
2023	Ballinamallard United	1	(0)
Total		569	(0)

International career
1998–1999	Northern Ireland U21	11	(0)
1997–2017	Northern Ireland	45	(0)

Managerial career
- 2011: Barnet (caretaker)
- * Club domestic league appearances and goals

Roy Eric Carroll (born 30 September 1977) is a Northern Irish professional football coach and former player who played as a goalkeeper. He is best known for his spells at English clubs Wigan Athletic and Manchester United (where he won a Premier League winners medal and the 2004 FA Cup) as well as in Greece with OFI and Olympiacos (where he won the Greek Super League and the Greek Cup twice). Carroll also represented Northern Ireland 45 times at full international level between 1997 and 2017, and was a part of their squad for UEFA Euro 2016.

Carroll has also had a one-game managerial career, leading Barnet to a 2–1 victory in the 2011 Herts Senior Cup final against Stevenage. Therefore, he holds the unusual honour of having won a trophy in his only game as a manager.

== Early career and personal life ==
Carroll was brought up in Tamlaght, County Fermanagh, and began his career with local sides Fivemiletown United and Ballinamallard United.

In November 2001, Carroll received a Red Cross Humanitarian Award for his kindness to a child with leukemia. In November 2006, he entered rehabilitation for alcohol-related addiction. 'Stress' was cited by the Carroll family.

== Club career ==
=== Hull City ===
Carroll joined Hull City in September 1995 as a trainee and went on to make 50 appearances for the club in all competitions but he was sold two seasons later to pay off Hull's mounting debts.

=== Wigan Athletic ===
Carroll signed for Wigan Athletic in April 1997 for a then club-record £350,000. Despite this, he would have to wait seven months to make his first appearance in November 1997 when he replaced Lee Butler in a 2–1 defeat of Watford. He made 170 appearances in all competitions in four years. He played a key role in Wigan's unbeaten run of 26 league games in 1999–2000 and was voted the best goalkeeper in the second division by his fellow professionals, a feat made all the more remarkable by the fact he missed the last seven games of the season having had to undergo an emergency appendix operation.

Despite speculation of a move to a Premier League club, Carroll remained at Wigan for the 2000–01 season, during which he went on to keep 13 clean sheets in 34 first-team games to help his team reach the play-offs for a second consecutive season. In the play-off semi final second leg against Reading the aggregate score was 1–1 as the game entered the final minute. Reading were awarded a penalty which Carroll saved from Jamie Cureton, but Nicky Forster scored from the rebound to send Reading through.

=== Manchester United ===
He was signed by defending Premier League champions Manchester United in July 2001 for an undisclosed fee believed to be £2.5 million. He made his debut in a 1–1 draw with Aston Villa on 26 August 2001. Carroll faced stiff competition against Fabien Barthez at United but won a Premier League winners' medal in the 2002–03 season. Carroll received yet more competition for the 2003–04 season, when Manchester United signed American goalkeeper Tim Howard after Barthez left to join Marseille. He won an FA Cup winners' medal in May 2004 when he came on as substitute for Howard in the 84th minute. On 19 February 2005, in an FA Cup match against Everton, Carroll was struck on the back of the head by any of various projectiles including coins and mobile phones, in a match high on security for teammate and Everton returnee Wayne Rooney which Manchester United won 2–0.

Carroll gained his greatest infamy for the "goal that never was" against Tottenham Hotspur in January 2005; a speculative shot from the half-way line by Pedro Mendes that Carroll dropped well behind his goal-line then scooped back into play. The referee and his linesmen were unable to verify that the ball had gone over the line and the goal was not given. Though Carroll got away with that particular gaffe, his error led to him being dropped for a few matches. He made a second blunder in a 1–0 defeat by Milan, where he spilled a shot into the path of Hernán Crespo, who then scored. He was released by Manchester United on 27 May 2005 after his contract expired; he refused to sign a new deal after the club failed to assure him that he would be first choice for the next season.

=== West Ham United ===
Three weeks after leaving Old Trafford, Carroll signed for West Ham. Carroll enjoyed a successful start to his West Ham career, making 19 appearances. However, a back injury sustained in a game against Fulham on 23 January 2006 left him needing surgery, and he was sidelined for the remainder of the 2005–06 season, including the FA Cup Final against Liverpool. Shaka Hislop was his replacement. He made just 17 appearances in the 2006–07 season, due to personal problems relating to alcohol and gambling and the arrival of Robert Green. His final game for the Hammers took place on 3 February 2007 against Aston Villa. On 25 May 2007, West Ham stated that he had been released after asking for a transfer to achieve regular first team football.

=== Rangers ===
Carroll signed for Rangers on a one-year contract on 7 July 2007, initially as cover for Allan McGregor but also to challenge for a starting place. He made his only appearance for Rangers against East Fife in a League Cup match on 26 September 2007.

=== Derby County ===
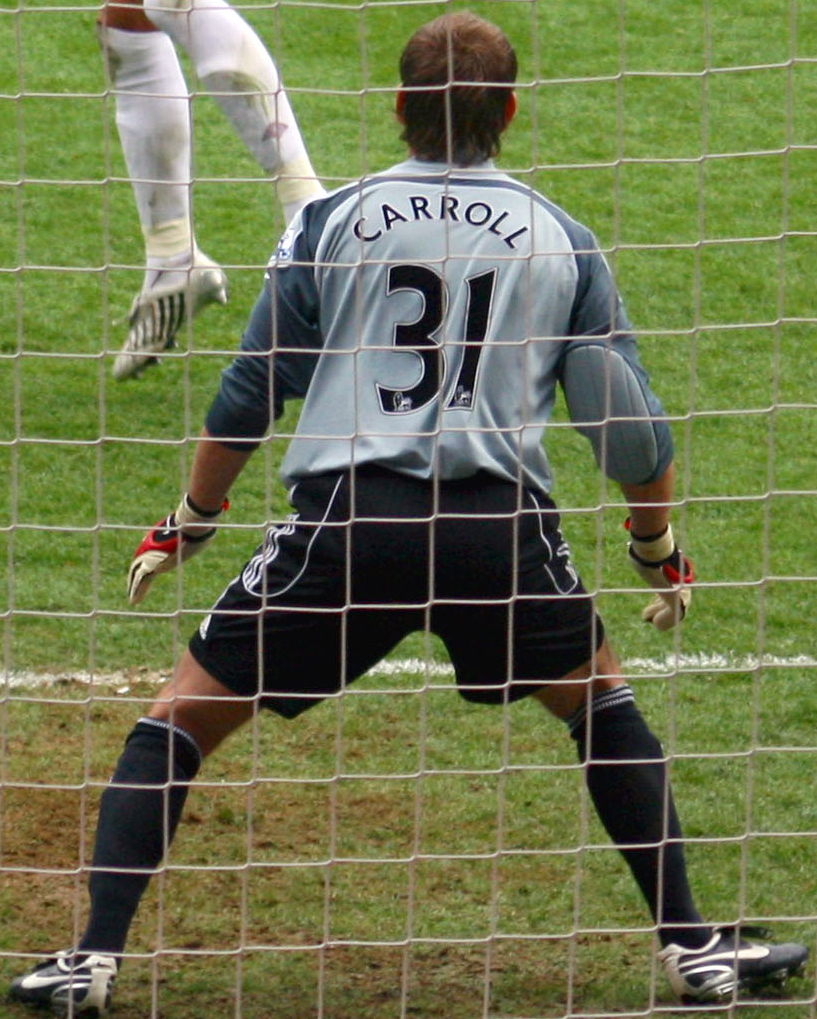
Carroll playing for Derby County in 2008

On 9 January 2008, it was revealed that Carroll was in line for a move to Premier League side Derby County. Carroll was allowed permission to talk with Derby and personal terms were agreed, but the deal hinged on Rangers signing a replacement goalkeeper. After over a week with little progress, Derby County called off the move, but when Carroll offered to pay the loan fee so Rangers could sign Sunderland keeper Darren Ward, the deal was revived. Carroll hoped to join Derby on loan for the rest of the 2007–08 season but the move was again held up by Rangers as they refused to release his registration until they found another keeper. After Rangers signed Neil Alexander from Ipswich Town, Carroll was free to sign for Derby, and a deal was completed on deadline day. He signed a three-year contract with the club on 21 January 2008, and made his debut in a Premier League match against Birmingham City on 2 February 2008. Carroll could not help the club avoid relegation to the Championship after just one season.

Carroll started the 2008–09 season as the club's first choice goalkeeper, but after getting sent off in a 2–1 victory at Norwich City he lost his place and was restricted to making appearances in cup competitions. He was part of the Derby side that reached the 2008–09 Football League Cup semi-final, where they lost 4–3 on aggregate to his former side Manchester United. After Paul Jewell resigned in December 2008, he was replaced by Nigel Clough. Clough made it clear Carroll was not in his plans and, a week into the 2009–10 season, it was announced that Carroll's contract with The Rams would be cancelled to allow him to move to Danish side Odense BK.

=== Odense Boldklub ===
Carroll signed a three-year contract with Danish Superliga side Odense BK on 17 August 2009. His debut was granted on the very same day and only hours after he had signed the deal, when he managed to keep a clean sheet in the 1–0 win against FC Midtjylland. Having played just 14 Superliga games, he was named 2009 Superliga Goalkeeper of the Year in December 2009, in a vote amongst the league goalkeepers. In November 2010, Carroll announced his decision to leave Odense BK in order to return to Britain to be closer to his family. The club soon signed Stefan Wessels as his replacement. Carroll's contract was mutually terminated on 31 January 2011 and he left Odense BK as a free agent, in search of a new club.

=== 2011 trial spells ===
Carroll had a trial at Sheffield United in March 2011. However, during a reserve match against Barnsley, he conceded two goals within ten minutes and was sent off after conceding a penalty. As a result, he was not offered a contract with the Blades. Later that same month, Carroll joined League Two strugglers Barnet on a trial with a view to a role as player-coach. After the departure of Martin Allen as manager in April 2011, and with caretaker manager Giuliano Grazioli on a scouting mission, Carroll was appointed as manager for the Herts Senior Cup final against Stevenage, which Barnet won 2–1. Thus, Carroll won a trophy in his only game as a football manager. He reportedly left the club in protest in April 2011, as his former Northern Ireland manager Lawrie Sanchez was set to take a managerial role in the club. In July 2011, Carroll joined Preston North End on trial and played in a 7–1 friendly victory at Kendal Town. However, despite a deal for Preston to sign Carroll being close, the club opted to sign Iain Turner instead.

=== OFI ===
In August 2011 Carroll signed a two-year contract with Greek Super League side OFI. Despite struggling for fitness and form in pre-season, Carroll appeared 16 times for the club, putting in some impressive performances, which made him highly regarded in Greece. He was ranked third in shots saved statistics amid speculation that bigger clubs in Greece were interested in Carroll.

=== Olympiacos ===
In January 2012 Carroll signed a contract with Greek Super League champions Olympiacos for a reported transfer fee of €100K. His first appearance was against Rubin Kazan in Moscow in the first match for the round of 32, in the Europa League, coming on as a late substitute after Balázs Megyeri conceded a penalty and was given a red card. Carroll saved the penalty with the first touch of his Olympiacos career and his team went on to win 0–1. In the return leg, Carroll put in a performance considered legendary by the fans, after producing a string of saves in whilst carrying a visible hamstring injury.

Carroll became the first-choice goalkeeper at the club in 2012–13 and featured in his first Champions League game since February 2005, when he played in a 2–1 win at Montpellier on 24 October 2012, after displacing Megyeri who started the opening two European games. In Olympiacos' first ten league games, Carroll played a part in a team which conceded only five goals and kept six clean sheets as they won the opening nine games, drawing the other. In an interview with British press, Carroll said that he was happy with his life in Greece and hopeful on extending his contract at Olympiacos. In his first twenty games for Olympiacos in all competitions, he was part of the winning side in eighteen games, drawing the other two, conceded ten goals and kept twelve clean sheets, losing in his twenty-first appearance against Schalke 04 0–1 on 21 November 2012. Carroll lost his place in the side to Megyeri in January, being relegated to cup appearances as Olympiacos won the double for a second consecutive season.

=== Notts County ===
Following his departure from Greek Superleague champions, Olympiacos, Carroll signed a one-year contract with Football League One side Notts County on 4 August 2014. On 15 November 2014, less than 24 hours after playing an international for Northern Ireland in Bucharest, Romania, Carroll kept a clean sheet as Notts County won 1–0 away at Coventry City.

=== Linfield ===
Carroll joined Linfield in 2016. After suffering a serious knee injury in January 2019, he left the club in May 2019 but planned to continue his playing career.

=== Dungannon Swifts ===
After a brief period playing for Mid-Ulster Football League junior side FC Mindwell, Carroll returned to the Irish League to sign for Dungannon Swifts in January 2021. At the end of the 2020–21 season, he left the club to move into coaching.

=== Ballinamallard United ===
On 2 January 2023, Carroll was a shock inclusion on the Ballinamallard United team sheet for a match against Annagh United, who were in the midst of an injury crisis. His return only lasted 35 minutes as he suffered a hamstring injury and had to be substituted with the team 1–0 down; they went on to lose 4–0. Carroll said after the game that he was now officially retired, having played his final game for the club where he had started his career.

== International career ==
Carroll gained his first full international cap on 21 May 1997 in a game against Thailand. For many years, Carroll fought a losing battle to be Northern Ireland's first-choice keeper to the experienced Maik Taylor. Despite this, Carroll had still amassed 19 caps up to September 2006. The last of these 19 caps came in a Euro 2008 qualifying match against Spain at Windsor Park. Northern Ireland pulled off a memorable 3–2 win, but Carroll had to be substituted after only 12 minutes due to a groin injury.

After a six-year absence from the international team, Carroll was named in the friendly squad to face the Netherlands on 2 June 2012. He came on as a substitute for the second half, conceding two goals as Northern Ireland lost 6–0. He made his competitive return to the Northern Ireland team on 7 September 2012, when he started in Northern Ireland's 2–0 defeat away to Russia in their opening qualifier for the 2014 FIFA World Cup. In May 2013, Carroll was named the Northern Ireland International Personality of the Year.

In May 2016, he was named in Northern Ireland's squad for UEFA Euro 2016.

== Career statistics ==
=== Club ===
Appearances and goals by club, season and competition
Club	Season	League			National Cup		League Cup		Europe		Other^{[A]}		Total	
Club	Season	Division	Apps	Goals	Apps	Goals	Apps	Goals	Apps	Goals	Apps	Goals	Apps	Goals
Hull City	1995–96	Second Division	23	0	0	0	0	0	—		0	0	23	0
Hull City	1996–97	Third Division	23	0	1	0	2	0	—		1	0	27	0
Hull City	Total		46	0	1	0	2	0	—		1	0	50	0
Wigan Athletic	1996–97	Third Division	0	0	0	0	0	0	—		0	0	0	0
Wigan Athletic	1997–98	Second Division	29	0	2	0	1	0	—		2	0	34	0
Wigan Athletic	1998–99	Second Division	43	0	3	0	4	0	—		9	0	59	0
Wigan Athletic	1999–2000	Second Division	34	0	2	0	3	0	—		2	0	41	0
Wigan Athletic	2000–01	Second Division	29	0	1	0	3	0	—		2	0	35	0
Wigan Athletic	Total		135	0	8	0	11	0	—		15	0	169	0
Manchester United	2001–02	Premier League	7	0	1	0	1	0	1	0	0	0	10	0
Manchester United	2002–03	Premier League	10	0	1	0	2	0	3	0	—		16	0
Manchester United	2003–04	Premier League	6	0	3	0	2	0	1	0	0	0	12	0
Manchester United	2004–05	Premier League	26	0	3	0	0	0	5	0	0	0	34	0
Manchester United	Total		49	0	8	0	5	0	10	0	0	0	72	0
West Ham United	2005–06	Premier League	19	0	0	0	0	0	—		—		19	0
West Ham United	2006–07	Premier League	12	0	2	0	0	0	2	0	—		16	0
West Ham United	Total		31	0	2	0	0	0	2	0	—		35	0
Rangers	2007–08	Scottish Premier League	0	0	0	0	1	0	0	0	—		1	0
Derby County	2007–08	Premier League	14	0	0	0	0	0	—		—		14	0
Derby County	2008–09	Championship	16	0	1	0	7	0	—		—		24	0
Derby County	Total		30	0	1	0	7	0	—		—		38	0
Odense BK	2009–10	Danish Superliga	28	0	2	0	—		2	0	—		32	0
Odense BK	2010–11	Danish Superliga	18	0	0	0	—		8	0	—		26	0
Odense BK	Total		46	0	2	0	—		10	0	—		58	0
OFI	2011–12	Super League Greece	16	0	0	0	—		—		—		16	0
Olympiacos	2011–12	Super League Greece	2	0	3	0	—		2	0	—		7	0
Olympiacos	2012–13	Super League Greece	16	0	4	0	—		5	0	—		25	0
Olympiacos	2013–14	Super League Greece	1	0	0	0	—		0	0	—		1	0
Olympiacos	Total		19	0	7	0	—		7	0	—		33	0
Notts County	2014–15	League One	45	0	2	0	1	0	—		2	0	50	0
Notts County	2015–16	League Two	32	0	0	0	0	0	—		2	0	34	0
Notts County	Total		77	0	2	0	1	0	0	0	4	0	84	0
Linfield	2016–17	NIFL Premiership	35	0	3	0	1	0	2	0	0	0	41	0
Linfield	2017–18	NIFL Premiership	28	0	0	0	1	0	4	0	1	0	34	0
Linfield	2018–19	NIFL Premiership	15	0	0	0	1	0	—		—		16	0
Linfield	Total		78	0	3	0	3	0	6	0	1	0	91	0
Ballinamallard United	2022-23	NIFL Championship	1	0	—		—		—		—		1	0
Career total			528	0	34	0	30	0	35	0	21	0	648	0

A. The "Other" column constitutes appearances and goals in the Football League Trophy, Football League play-offs and FA Community Shield.

=== International ===
As of 27 May 2016

Appearances and goals by national team and year
National team	Year	Apps	Goals
Northern Ireland	1997	1	0
Northern Ireland	1999	1	0
Northern Ireland	2000	5	0
Northern Ireland	2001	2	0
Northern Ireland	2002	2	0
Northern Ireland	2003	2	0
Northern Ireland	2004	3	0
Northern Ireland	2005	1	0
Northern Ireland	2006	2	0
Northern Ireland	2012	6	0
Northern Ireland	2013	6	0
Northern Ireland	2014	8	0
Northern Ireland	2015	3	0
Northern Ireland	2016	2	0
Northern Ireland	2017	1	0
Total		45	0

== Honours ==
=== As a player ===
Wigan Athletic

- Football League Trophy: 1998–99

Manchester United

- Premier League: 2002–03
- FA Cup: 2003–04
- FA Community Shield: 2003
- Football League Cup runner-up: 2002–03

Olympiacos

- Super League Greece: 2012–13
- Greek Football Cup: 2011–12, 2012–13

Linfield

- NIFL Premiership: 2016–17, 2018–19
- Irish Cup: 2016–17
- County Antrim Shield: 2016–17
- NIFL Charity Shield: 2017

Individual

- PFA Team of the Year: 1999–2000 Second Division
- Danish Goalkeeper of the Year: 2009
- Northern Ireland International Personality of the Year: 2013
- Linfield Player of the Year: 2016–17

=== As a manager ===
Barnet

- Herts Senior Cup: 2010–11
