= Erik Boye =

Danish footballer (born 1964)

Personal information
- Full name: Erik Boye
- Date of birth: 7 February 1964 (age 62)
- Place of birth: Denmark
- Height: 1.86 m (6 ft 1 in)
- Position: Goalkeeper

Senior career*
Years	Team	Apps	(Gls)
1990–1993	Fredericia		
1993–2000	Vejle	208	(0)
2000–2002	AGF Aarhus	78	(0)

Managerial career
- 2003?–2008: SønderjyskE (goalkeeping coach)
- 2008?–2013: Vejle-Kolding (goalkeeping coach)
- 2013–: Randers FC (goalkeeping coach)
- * Club domestic league appearances and goals

Erik Boye (born 7 February 1964) is a Danish former professional footballer who played as a goalkeeper.

He started his career with FC Fredericia before transferring to Vejle in 1993. In the 1996–97 Danish Superliga he was ever-present as his club finished in 2nd place and qualified for the 1997–98 UEFA Cup. He played well over 200 games for Vejle

After his time at Vejle he moved to AGF Aarhus, and he played for them for another three seasons.

As of July 2012 he was the goalkeeping coach at Vejle.

In May 2013 he was appointed as goalkeeping coach at Randers FC.
