= Johan Wiland =

Swedish footballer (born 1981)

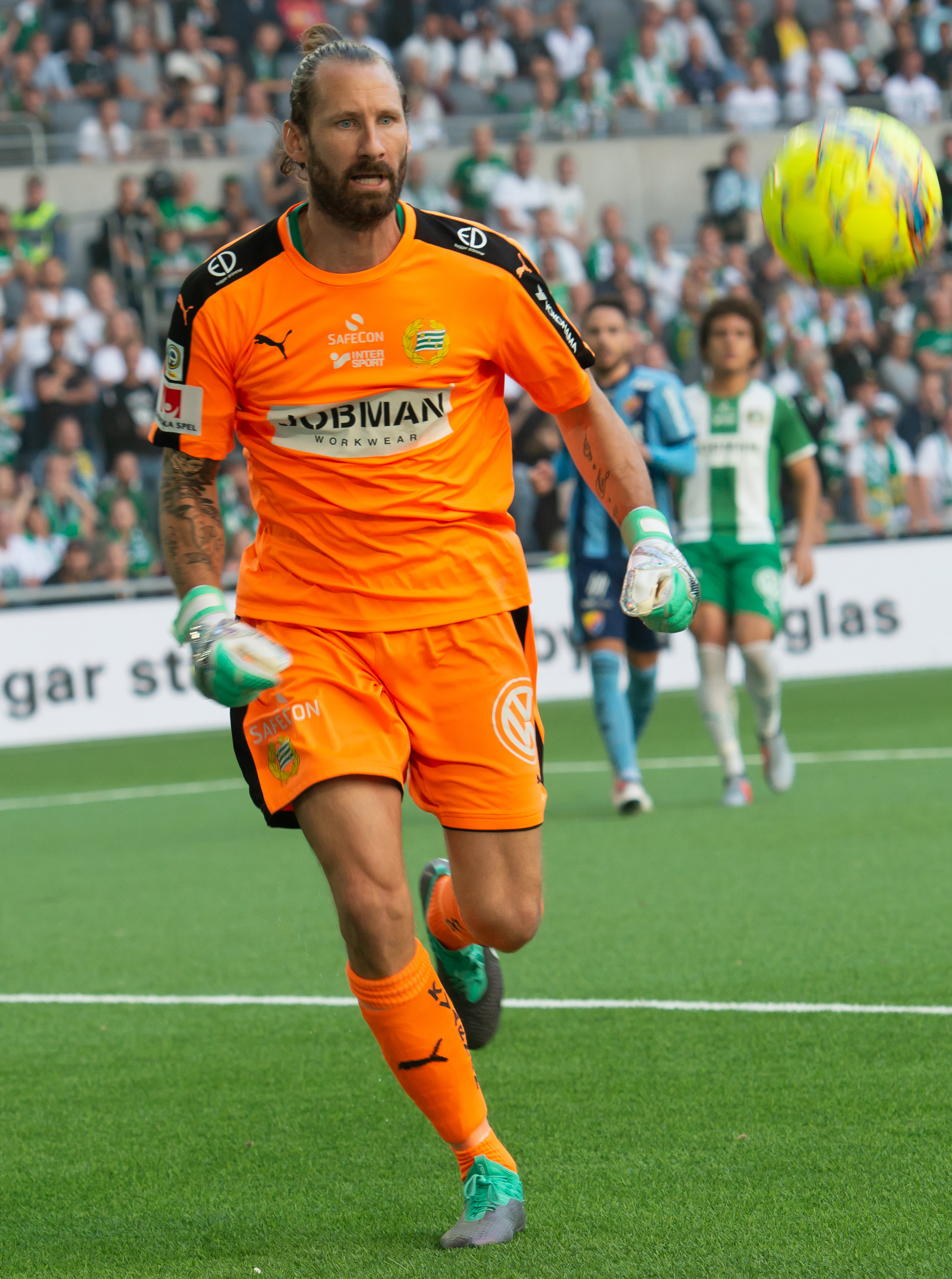
- Wiland with Hammarby IF in 2018

Personal information
- Full name: Johan Kristoffer Sellberg-Wiland
- Date of birth: 24 January 1981 (age 45)
- Place of birth: Borås, Sweden
- Height: 1.88 m (6 ft 2 in)
- Position: Goalkeeper

Youth career
- –1997: Rydboholms SK
- 1997–2000: IF Elfsborg

Senior career*
| Years | Team | Apps | (Gls) |
| 2000–2008 | IF Elfsborg | 206 | (0) |
| 2009–2015 | Copenhagen | 142 | (0) |
| 2015–2017 | Malmö FF | 58 | (0) |
| 2017–2019 | Hammarby IF | 46 | (0) |
| Total | | 452 | (0) |

International career
| 1997 | Sweden U16 | 1 | (0) |
| 1998–1999 | Sweden U18 | 4 | (0) |
| 2001–2004 | Sweden U21 | 11 | (0) |
| 2007–2013 | Sweden | 9 | (0) |
- * Club domestic league appearances and goals

Johan Kristoffer Sellberg-Wiland (born 24 January 1981) is a Swedish former professional footballer who played as a goalkeeper. Starting off his career in Sweden with IF Elfsborg in the early 2000s, he went on to represent F.C. Copenhagen and Malmö FF before retiring at Hammarby IF in 2019. A full international between 2007 and 2013, he won nine caps for the Sweden national team and was a part of their UEFA Euro 2008 and 2012 squads.

== Club career ==
=== Early career ===
Johan Wiland was born in Borås, but grew up in the locality of Viskafors. He started playing football at a young age at the local club Rydboholms SK. Simultaneously, he played ice hockey in his early teens.

He made his debut in Rydboholms senior team at age 16, in the Swedish seventh level, and got scouted by the goalkeeping coach of local club IF Elfsborg. In 1997, Wiland joined the club's youth system.

=== IF Elfsborg ===
Wiland made his senior debut for Elfsborg in an away game against Halmstad BK on 4 May 2000, and was denied the clean sheet from a 91st-minute penalty kick. Throughout the rest of the season, the 19-year old Wiland rotated with the far more experienced Anders Bogsjö as Elfsborg's first choice.

During the upcoming season, Wiland established himself as the starting goalkeeper at Elfsborg. On 25 May 2001, he started in the final of the Svenska Cupen against AIK. The game ended 1–1 after full-time and overtime, but Elfsborg won 9–10 on penalties. On 9 August the same year, Wiland made his continental debut in a UEFA Cup qualifying fixture against the Estonian side Narva Trans. Elfsborg won the game 1–3.

Except from missing a few games due to suspensions, Wiland played all of Elfsborg's competitive games in Allsvenskan between 2002 and 2004. The club finished in the lower regions of the table during all three of the campaigns. In 2003, Elfsborg won the Svenska Cupen again, beating Assyriska FF in the final on 1 November. Johan Wiland kept a clean sheet as Lasse Nilsson scored a brace, deciding the result to 2–0 at Råsunda Stadium. Elfsborg participated in the 2004–05 UEFA Cup, where the club eventually lost in the first round against the Croatian side Dinamo Zagreb. Wiland kept a clean sheet in the home leg, 0–0, but Elfsborg lost 2–0 in the away fixture and got knocked out of the tournament.

In 2005, Wiland missed the more part of the season due to a fracture in the forearm, and only played 11 games in Allsvenskan. The club's best season in its history came in 2006, when they won Allsvenskan. Wiland started in all 26 matches throughout the campaign, conceded 19 goals (least in the league) and kept 12 clean sheets. As reigning Swedish champions, Elfsborg participated in the qualification to the 2007–08 UEFA Champions League. The club got knocked out in the third qualifying round against Valencia CF on 29 August 2007, 1–5 on aggregate, as the Spanish side became the first visiting team to win at Borås Arena in eight months. Subsequently, Elfsborg competed in the 2007–08 UEFA Cup where they got knocked out in the group stage. Wiland appeared in all of the six fixtures.

In 2008, Wiland set a new league record when he kept 19 clean sheets in one season. Elfsborg eventually finished 2nd in the league and Wiland attracted much interest from clubs abroad. During the fall of 2008, he turned down a move to the Premier League side Tottenham. He was reportedly sought out as a back-up to Heurelho Gomes, but Wiland wanted to play more regularly. At the end of the year, Wiland was prized as the Swedish Goalkeeper of the Year at the annual Fotbollsgalan, hosted by the Swedish Football Association.

=== F.C. Copenhagen ===
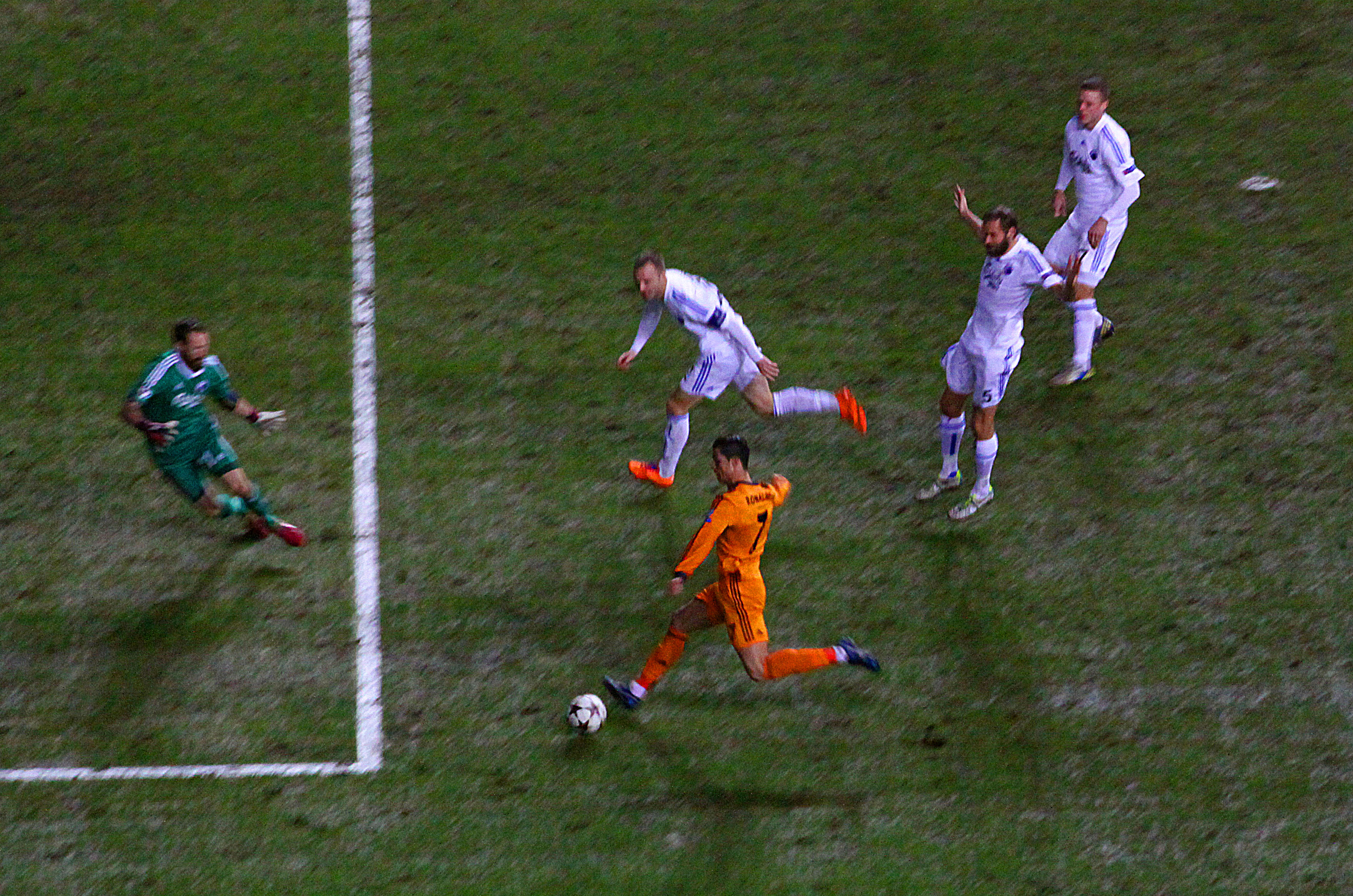
Wiland playing for FC Copenhagen against Real Madrid in 2013

In January 2009, Wiland moved to F.C. Copenhagen in the Danish Superliga. He signed a five-year deal with the club, and a fee of 8 million Danish kroner (approximately £1 million) was suggested.

At first, Wiland struggled to get playing time, acting as a back-up to Danish international Jesper Christiansen during the whole spring of 2009.

During the next season, in 2009–10, Wiland established himself as the first choice goalkeeper at Copenhagen. In 2010, Wiland won a number of honours including Goalkeeper of the Year in Denmark and Swedish Goalkeeper of the Year (for the second time in his career). During the campaign, Wiland was also named in the UEFA Champions League "Team of the week".

The following season, in 2011–12, he recorded the second most clean sheets in the league. On top of that, Wiland won the prize as Goalkeeper of the Year in Denmark in 2011 (his second consecutive win) and got voted as F.C. Copenhagen Player of the Year in 2012.

In 2012–13, Wiland suffered from a number of injuries and his form declined. Manager Ståle Solbakken openly criticized the goalkeeper's form. He would however remain as the first choice throughout the whole season. A highlight for Wiland during the season was Copenhagen's surprising 1–1 draw against the Serie A club Juventus on 17 September 2013. Wiland saved a point for his side in the Champions League group stage tie, thanks to a series of saves in the second half.

During the summer of 2014, Wiland lost his place in the first team at Copenhagen, following the signing of the Danish international Stephan Andersen. Wiland remained at the bench throughout the whole year and saw his playing time limited to one appearance in the Danish Cup.

In total, Wiland played 141 games in the Danish Superliga during his stint at Copenhagen. He also made 43 appearances in continental cups (UEFA Champions League and UEFA Europa League) and won 8 caps in the domestic cup. In 2014, Wiland was selected as the goalkeeper when 32,000 fans participated in a fan vote selecting their 11 all-time favourite Copenhagen players.

=== Malmö FF ===
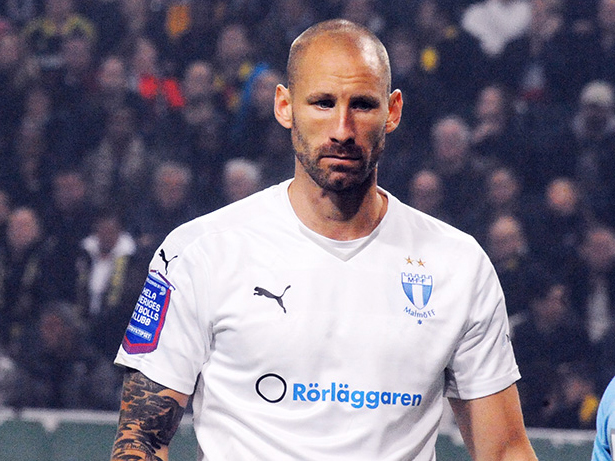
Wiland playing for Malmö FF in 2015

In July 2015, he transferred to Malmö FF, following the sale of their previous first choice goalkeeper Robin Olsen to PAOK in the Super League Greece. Wiland signed a two-and-a-half-year deal with the side. During the same fall, Johan Wiland kept a clean sheet as Malmö won (2–0) against Celtic in the 2015–16 Champions League group play-off round on 25 August. Malmö advanced to the group stage with an aggregated score of 4–3. Eventually, Malmö finished last in their group, surpassed by European clubs Paris Saint-Germain and Real Madrid. Wiland kept a clean sheet in the home leg against Shaktar Donetsk on 21 October, as Malmö won 1–0 – thus claiming their only victory in the group stage.

The following season, in 2016, Malmö won the domestic championship. Wiland played 28 games and kept 12 clean sheets, the second most in the whole league. At the end of the year, he was voted as the Goalkeeper of the Year in Allsvenskan.

As reigning champions, Malmö qualified for the 2017–18 Champions League. The side entered the tournament in the second qualifying round, where they faced Vardar from Macedonia. Surprisingly, Malmö got knocked out on 18 July after losing 4–2 on aggregate. Roughly at the same time, Wiland sought a move away from the club for personal reasons. He expressed a wish to live closer to his family in Stockholm. Simultaneously, Malmö had acquired goalkeeper Johan Dahlin from FC Midtjylland and Wiland got permission to leave the club. In total, Wiland made 16 league appearances for Malmö in 2017, and the club went on to win Allsvenskan in October after his departure.

=== Hammarby IF ===
On 28 July 2017, Wiland transferred to Hammarby IF on a two-and-a-half-year contract. He made his debut the following day in a 1–0 away loss against Jönköpings Södra. Wiland kept his first clean sheet for the side on 21 August, as Hammarby won 3–0 away against Örebro SK. He received much praise for his performance in a derby fixture against AIK on 10 September, where Wiland kept the score to 1–1 following a series of saves. After the 2017 season, Wiland was nominated as Swedish Goalkeeper of the Year, following his performances at both Malmö and Hammarby, and won his second consecutive prize as Goalkeeper of the year in Allsvenskan.

On 13 August 2018, in a 0–0 away draw against IFK Norrköping, Wiland kept his 100th clean sheet in Allsvenskan. He played 25 games during the year, as Hammarby finished 4th in Allsvenskan. Wiland's season was cut short in October when he went under the knife due to a shoulder injury.

After being sidelined during the first half of the 2019 season, Wiland made his comeback to the pitch as a substitute in a 2–2 draw against Kalmar FF on 4 August. He eventually played 7 games in Allsvenskan, competing with the former second choice keeper Davor Blažević, as Hammarby finished third in the table.

On 17 February 2020, Wiland announced his immediate retirement from professional football after not being able to recover properly from a shoulder injury, aged 39.

== International career ==
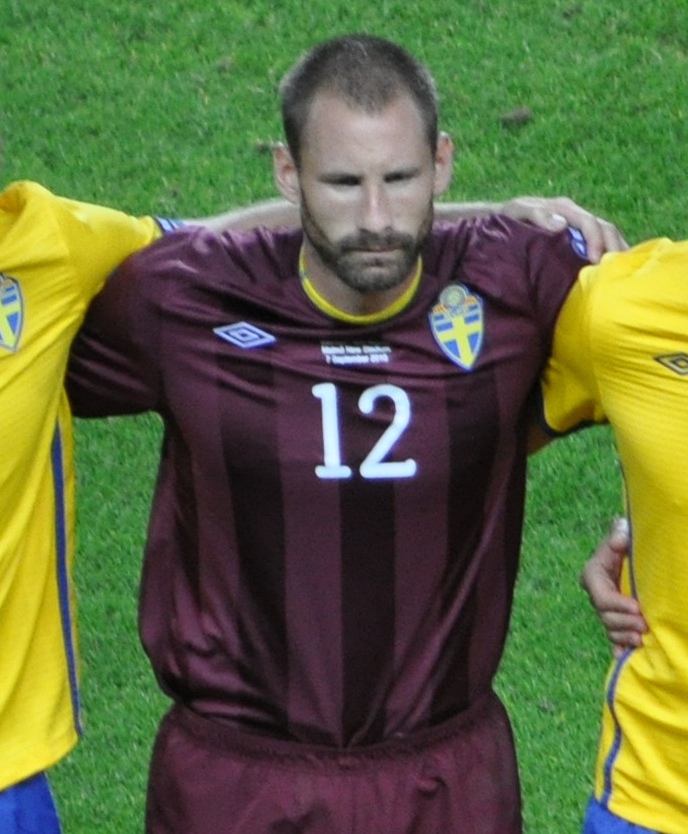
Johan Wiland lining up for Sweden before a UEFA Euro qualifying match against San Marino on 7 September 2010

Wiland made his debut in the Sweden national team came against Ecuador on a tour in South America in January 2007.

He represented his country at the UEFA Euro 2008 in Austria and Switzerland where he acted as back up to Andreas Isaksson. He was seen as manager Lars Lagerbäck's third choice, behind Isaksson and Rami Shaaban.

Wiland was also called up to the Swedish side by manager Erik Hamrén ahead of the UEFA Euro 2012, again acting as a back up to Isaksson.

His last competitive appearance for Sweden came in a 5–3 loss against Germany on 15 October 2013. Ultimately, his country failed to qualify for the 2014 FIFA World Cup and Wiland subsequently announced his international retirement to the Swedish coaching staff.

== Career statistics ==
=== International ===
Appearances and goals by national team and year
| National team | Year | Apps | Goals |
|---|---|---|---|
| Sweden | 2007 | 2 | 0 |
| Sweden | 2008 | 1 | 0 |
| Sweden | 2009 | 0 | 0 |
| Sweden | 2010 | 2 | 0 |
| Sweden | 2011 | 2 | 0 |
| Sweden | 2012 | 1 | 0 |
| Sweden | 2013 | 1 | 0 |
| Total | | 9 | 0 |

== Honours ==
IF Elfsborg

- Allsvenskan: 2006
- Svenska Cupen: 2001, 2003
- Svenska Supercupen: 2007

F.C. Copenhagen

- Danish Superliga: 2008–09, 2009–10, 2010–11, 2012–13
- Danish Cup: 2008–09, 2011–12, 2014–15

Malmö FF

- Allsvenskan: 2016, 2017

Sweden

- King's Cup: 2003

Individual

- Swedish Goalkeeper of the Year: 2008, 2010
- Goalkeeper of the Year in Denmark: 2010, 2011
- F.C. Copenhagen Player of the Year: 2012
- Allsvenskan Goalkeeper of the Year: 2016, 2017
