= Troels Rasmussen =

Danish footballer (born 1961)

Personal information
- Date of birth: 7 April 1961 (age 65)
- Place of birth: Ebeltoft, Denmark
- Height: 1.93 m (6 ft 4 in)
- Position: Goalkeeper

Senior career*
Years	Team	Apps	(Gls)
1980–1981	Vejle BK	13	(0)
1982–1994	AGF	333	(3)
Total		346	(3)

International career
1982–1991	Denmark	35	(0)
- * Club domestic league appearances and goals

Troels Rasmussen (born 7 April 1961) is a Danish former professional footballer who played as a goalkeeper for Danish clubs Vejle Boldklub and AGF. He played 391 games for AGF, and scored five goals from penalty kicks. From 1982 to 1991, he played 35 matches for the Denmark national team, and represented Denmark at the Euro 1984, Euro 1988 and 1986 World Cup tournaments. He played two matches at each of the two latter tournaments.
