= Julia Willand =

South African beach volleyball player (born 1972)

Personal information
- Nationality: South Africa
- Born: April 6, 1972 (age 54); Nuremberg, West Germany
- Height: 1.78 m (5 ft 10 in)
- Weight: 69 kg (152 lb)

Julia Willand (born 6 April 1972 in Nuremberg) is a South African beach volleyball player.

Willand was born in Nuremberg, West Germany, and came at the age of six years with her family to South Africa. Between 1991 and 2002 she competed in indoor volleyball where she attended the 2001 Women's African Volleyball Championship in Port Harcourt, Nigeria, with the South African national team.

In 2002 she decided to move to the beach volleyball and formed a duo with Leigh-Ann Naidoo. They competed at the FIVB Beach Volleyball World Tour in 2003 and 2004 and qualified for the Summer Olympics, in Athens. They lost all three matches in the group stage and did not advance to the medal round.
