= Helmut Wielandt =

German mathematician (1910–2001)

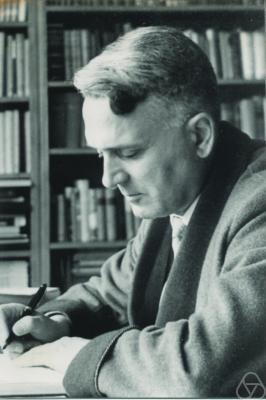
Helmut Wielandt

Helmut Wielandt (19 December 1910 – 14 February 2001) was a German mathematician who worked on permutation groups.

He was born in Niedereggenen, Lörrach, Germany. He gave a plenary lecture Entwicklungslinien in der Strukturtheorie der endlichen Gruppen (Lines of Development in the Structure Theory of Finite Groups) at the International Congress of Mathematicians (ICM) in 1958 at Edinburgh and was an Invited Speaker with talk Bedingungen für die Konjugiertheit von Untergruppen endlicher Gruppen (Conditions for the Conjugacy of Finite Groups) at the ICM in 1962 in Stockholm.

Among his work in Algebra is an elegant proof of the Sylow Theorems (replacing an older cumbersome proof involving double cosets) that is in the standard textbooks on Abstract Algebra, i.e. Group Theory.

== See also ==
- Collatz–Wielandt formula
- Wielandt theorem

== Publications ==
- Wielandt, Helmut (1964), Finite permutation groups, Boston, MA: Academic Press, MR 0183775 (translated by Ronald D. Bercov)
  - Wielandt, Helmut (10 May 2014). 2014 pbk reprint. Academic Press. ISBN 9781483258294.
- Topics in the analytic theory of matrices: Lecture notes prepared by Robert R. Meyer from a course by Helmut Wielandt, Department of Mathematics, University of Wisconsin at Madison, 1967, ASIN B0007EOBYU; 129 pages, pbk
- Wielandt, Helmut (1994), Huppert, Bertram; Schneider, Hans (eds.), Mathematische Werke/Mathematical works. Vol. 1. Group theory, Berlin: Walter de Gruyter & Co., ISBN 978-3-11-012452-1, MR 1272467
- Wielandt, Helmut (1996), Huppert, Bertram; Schneider, Hans (eds.), Mathematische Werke/Mathematical works. Vol. 2. Linear algebra and analysis, Berlin: Walter de Gruyter & Co., ISBN 978-3-11-012453-8, MR 1430098
