= 2002–03 Sunderland A.F.C. season =

English football club season

Sunderland A.F.C.
2002–03 season
- Chairman: Bob Murray
- Manager: Peter Reid (until 7 October); Howard Wilkinson (from 10 October until 10 March); Mick McCarthy (from 12 March)
- Stadium: Stadium of Light
- FA Premier League: 20th (relegated)
- FA Cup: Fifth round
- League Cup: Fourth round
- Top goalscorer: League: Kevin Phillips (6); All: Kevin Phillips (9)
- Highest home attendance: 47,586 (vs. Manchester United, 31 August)
- Lowest home attendance: 14,550 (vs. Bolton Wanderers, 14 January)
- Average home league attendance: 36,885

During the 2002–03 season, Sunderland competed in the FA Premier League.

== Season summary ==
Sunderland spent the entire first half of the 2002–03 Premier League season in and out of the relegation zone. The poor form that the club had ended 2001–02 with continued into this season, resulting in Peter Reid being sacked after seven years as manager following a 3–1 loss to Arsenal in October just before the international break. Three days later, despite speculation linking recently-departed Ireland manager Mick McCarthy to the job, the board made the shock decision to hire Howard Wilkinson, who had been out of club management for six years.

Despite a loss to West Ham in Wilkinson's first match in charge, Sunderland ground out a four-match unbeaten run in the games that followed, as well as gaining a surprise victory over Liverpool and a point against fellow strugglers West Brom just before Christmas. However, a truly appalling second half of the season saw Sunderland earn just one point after Christmas. Wilkinson was sacked in March and McCarthy brought in to replace him, but the change proved too little too late, with Sunderland ending the season with a staggering run of 15 consecutive defeats, and setting new records for the fewest goals scored by a top-flight club, and the lowest points total for a Premier League club since the competition began (albeit not the lowest since the introduction of three points for a win; Sunderland would, however, break that record three seasons later).

== Transfers ==
=== In ===
==== Summer ====
Date	Pos	Name	From	Fee
8 July 2002	MF	(Republic of Ireland) Sean Thornton	(England) Tranmere Rovers	£225,000
15 August 2002	DF	(England) Stephen Wright	(England) Liverpool	£3,000,000
21 August 2002	MF	(England) Matt Piper	(England) Leicester City	£3,500,000
30 August 2002	FW	(Norway) Tore Andre Flo	(Scotland) Rangers	£6,750,000
30 August 2002	FW	(England) Marcus Stewart	(England) Ipswich Town	£3,250,000
15 November 2002	GK	(Estonia) Mart Poom	(England) Derby County	Loan

==== January ====
Date	Pos	Name	From	Fee
10 January 2003	GK	(Estonia) Mart Poom	(England) Derby County	£2,500,000
31 January 2003	DF	(Morocco) Talal El Karkouri	(France) Paris Saint Germain	Loan

=== Out ===
==== Summer ====
Date	Pos	Name	To	Fee
31 October 2002	MF	(Wales) John Oster	(England) Grimsby Town	Loan
1 November 2002	FW	(Republic of Ireland) Michael Reddy	(England) York City	Loan
7 November 2002	MF	(Republic of Ireland) Sean Thornton	(England) Blackpool	Loan
22 November 2002	GK	(Northern Ireland) Michael Ingham	(England) Darlington	Loan

==== January ====
Date	Pos	Name	To	Fee
11 January 2003	FW	(Scotland) Dene Shields	(Scotland) Raith Rovers	£60,000
24 January 2003	GK	(Northern Ireland) Michael Ingham	(England) York City	Loan
30 January 2003	FW	(Republic of Ireland) Michael Reddy	(England) Sheffield Wednesday	Loan
12 February 2003	DF	(Slovakia) Stanislav Varga	(Scotland) Celtic	Free
21 February 2003	MF	(Wales) John Oster	(England) Grimsby Town	Loan
27 March 2003	FW	(Republic of Ireland) Keith Graydon	(England) York City	Loan

== Players ==
=== First-team squad ===
Squad at end of season

Note: Flags indicate national team as defined under FIFA eligibility rules; some limited exceptions apply. Players may hold more than one non-FIFA nationality.

No.	Pos.	Nation	Player
1	GK	DEN	Thomas Sørensen
2	DF	ENG	Stephen Wright
3	DF	ENG	Michael Gray (captain)
4	MF	USA	Claudio Reyna
5	DF	IRL	Phil Babb (Note: Babb was born in Lambeth, England, but also qualified to represent the Republic of Ireland internationally and made his international debut for the Republic of Ireland in 1994.)
6	DF	BRA	Emerson Thome
7	MF	ENG	Matt Piper
8	MF	ENG	Gavin McCann
9	FW	NOR	Tore André Flo
10	FW	ENG	Kevin Phillips
11	MF	IRL	Kevin Kilbane (Note: Kilbane was born in Preston, England, but also qualified to represent the Republic of Ireland internationally through his parents and represented them at U-21 level before making his international debut for Republic of Ireland in September 1997.)
12	DF	SWE	Joachim Björklund
14	MF	IRL	Thomas Butler
15	FW	FRA	David Bellion
16	MF	IRL	Jason McAteer (Note: McAteer was born in Tranmere, England, but also qualified to represent the Republic of Ireland internationally and made his international debut for the Republic of Ireland in March 1994.)
17	DF	ENG	Jody Craddock
18	DF	ENG	Darren Williams
19	FW	SCO	Kevin Kyle

No.	Pos.	Nation	Player
20	MF	SWE	Stefan Schwarz
21	MF	ENG	Paul Thirlwell
22	DF	MAR	Talal El Karkouri (on loan from Paris Saint-Germain)
23	MF	ARG	Nicolás Medina
24	MF	IRL	Sean Thornton
25	DF	ENG	Ben Clark
26	GK	NOR	Thomas Myhre
27	DF	NIR	George McCartney
28	MF	WAL	John Oster (Note: Oster was born in Boston, England, but also qualified to represent Wales internationally and represented them at U-18 and U-21 level before making his international debut for Wales in 1997.)
29	MF	ENG	Chris Black
30	GK	AUT	Jürgen Macho
31	FW	ENG	Marcus Stewart
32	FW	ENG	Michael Proctor
33	DF	ARG	Julio Arca
34	DF	IRL	Mark Rossiter
36	MF	IRL	Richie Ryan
37	MF	ENG	Jonjo Dickman
40	GK	EST	Mart Poom

=== Left club during season ===
Note: Flags indicate national team as defined under FIFA eligibility rules; some limited exceptions apply. Players may hold more than one non-FIFA nationality.

No.	Pos.	Nation	Player
22	DF	SVK	Stanislav Varga (to Celtic)
22	DF	SUI	Bernt Haas (Note: Haas was born in Vienna, Austria, but also qualified to represent Switzerland internationally and made his international debut for Switzerland in 1996.) (on loan to Basel)

No.	Pos.	Nation	Player
29	FW	IRL	Niall Quinn (retired)

== Reserve squad ==
Note: Flags indicate national team as defined under FIFA eligibility rules; some limited exceptions apply. Players may hold more than one non-FIFA nationality.

No.	Pos.	Nation	Player
13	GK	NIR	Michael Ingham (Note: Ingham was born in Preston, England, but also qualified to represent Northern Ireland internationally and represented them at U-18 and U-21 level before making his international debut for Northern Ireland in June 2005.)
35	DF	IRL	Cliff Byrne
38	GK	ENG	Craig Turns
41	DF	ENG	Patrick Collins
—	GK	ENG	John Kennedy
—	DF	ENG	Chris Scott
—	DF	ENG	Craig James

No.	Pos.	Nation	Player
—	DF	IRL	Stephen Capper
—	DF	TUR	Baki Mercimek (Note: Mercimek was born in Amsterdam, the Netherlands, but also qualified to represent Turkey internationally and would represent them at U-21 level before making his international debut for Turkey in 2006.)
—	MF	ENG	Grant Leadbitter
—	MF	ENG	Carl Shippen
—	FW	SCO	Dene Shields
—	FW	NIR	Neil Teggart
—	FW	IRL	Keith Graydon

== Results ==
=== Football League Cup ===
Date	Round	Opponent	Venue	Result	Attendance	Scorers
1 October 2002	Second round	Cambridge United	Abbey Stadium	7–0	8,175	Reyna, McCann, Arca, Flo (2), Stewart (2)
6 November 2002	Third round	Arsenal	Highbury	3–2	19,059	Kyle, Stewart (2)
3 December 2002	Fourth round	Sheffield United	Bramall Lane	0–2	27,068	

=== FA Cup ===
Date	Round	Opponent	Venue	Result	Attendance	Scorers
4 January 2003	Third round	Bolton Wanderers	Reebok Stadium	1–1	10,132	Phillips
14 January 2003	Third round replay	Bolton Wanderers	Stadium of Light	2–0	14,550	Arca, Proctor
25 January 2003	Fourth round	Blackburn Rovers	Ewood Park	3–3	14,315	Stewart, Proctor and Phillips
5 February 2003	Fourth round replay	Blackburn Rovers	Stadium of Light	2–2 a.e.t. (won 3–0 on penalties)	15,745	McCann, Phillips
15 February 2003	Fifth round	Watford	Stadium of Light	0–1	26,916	

=== FA Premier League ===
==== League table ====
Pos	Team	Pld	W	D	L	GF	GA	GD	Pts	Qualification or relegation
16	Aston Villa	38	12	9	17	42	47	−5	45	
17	Bolton Wanderers	38	10	14	14	41	51	−10	44	
18	West Ham United (R)	38	10	12	16	42	59	−17	42	Relegation to Football League First Division
19	West Bromwich Albion (R)	38	6	8	24	29	65	−36	26	Relegation to Football League First Division
20	Sunderland (R)	38	4	7	27	21	65	−44	19	Relegation to Football League First Division

Source: Premier League
Rules for classification: 1) points; 2) goal difference; 3) number of goals scored.
(R) Relegated

==== Results per matchday ====
Matchday	1	2	3	4	5	6	7	8	9	10	11	12	13	14	15	16	17	18	19	20	21	22	23	24	25	26	27	28	29	30	31	32	33	34	35	36	37	38
Ground	A	H	A	H	A	H	A	H	A	H	A	A	H	A	H	A	H	H	A	H	A	A	H	A	H	H	A	H	A	H	A	H	A	H	A	H	A	H
Result	D	L	W	D	L	L	L	W	L	L	D	D	W	D	L	L	L	W	D	L	L	L	D	L	L	L	L	L	L	L	L	L	L	L	L	L	L	L
Position	10	14	10	11	12	18	19	16	17	18	19	18	16	17	17	18	19	17	17	18	18	18	18	18	18	20	20	20	20	20	20	20	20	20	20	20	20	20

Source: Statto.com
A = Away; H = Home; W = Win; D = Draw; L = Loss

Date	Opponents	Venue	Result	Scorers	Attendance
17 August 2002	Blackburn Rovers	Ewood Park	0–0		27,122
24 August 2002	Everton	Stadium of Light	0–1		37,698
28 August 2002	Leeds United	Elland Road	1–0	McAteer 46'	39,929
31 August 2002	Manchester United	Stadium of Light	1–1	Flo 70'	47,586
10 September 2002	Middlesbrough	Riverside Stadium	0–3		32,155
14 September 2002	Fulham	Stadium of Light	0–3		35,432
21 September 2002	Newcastle United	St James' Park	0–2		52,181
28 September 2002	Aston Villa	Stadium of Light	1–0	Bellion 70'	40,492
6 October 2002	Arsenal	Highbury	1–3	Craddock 83'	37,902
19 October 2002	West Ham United	Stadium of Light	0–1		44,352
28 October 2002	Bolton Wanderers	Reebok Stadium	1–1	Gray 45'	23,036
3 November 2002	Charlton Athletic	The Valley	1–1	Flo 15'	26,284
10 November 2002	Tottenham Hotspur	Stadium of Light	2–0	Phillips 60', Flo 62'	40,024
17 November 2002	Liverpool	Anfield	0–0		43,074
23 November 2002	Birmingham City	Stadium of Light	0–1		38,803
30 November 2002	Chelsea	Stamford Bridge	0–3		38,946
9 December 2002	Manchester City	Stadium of Light	0–3		36,511
15 December 2002	Liverpool	Stadium of Light	2–1	McCann 36', Proctor 85'	37,118
21 December 2002	West Bromwich Albion	The Hawthorns	2–2	Phillips 56', 64'	26,703
26 December 2002	Leeds United	Stadium of Light	1–2	Proctor 34'	44,029
28 December 2002	Southampton	St Mary's Stadium	1–2	Flo 77'	36,242
1 January 2003	Manchester United	Old Trafford	1–2	Verón 4' o.g.	67,609
11 January 2003	Blackburn Rovers	Stadium of Light	0–0		36,529
18 January 2003	Everton	Goodison Park	1–2	Kilbane 34'	37,409
28 January 2003	Southampton	Stadium of Light	0–1		34,102
1 February 2003	Charlton Athletic	Stadium of Light	1–3	Phillips 81' pen.	36,042
8 February 2003	Tottenham Hotspur	White Hart Lane	1–4	Phillips 26'	36,075
22 February 2003	Middlesbrough	Stadium of Light	1–3	Phillips 56'	42,134
1 March 2003	Fulham	Loftus Road	0–1		16,286
15 March 2003	Bolton Wanderers	Stadium of Light	0–2		42,124
22 March 2003	West Ham United	Boleyn Ground	0–2		35,033
5 April 2003	Chelsea	Stadium of Light	1–2	Thornton 12'	40,011
12 April 2003	Birmingham City	St. Andrew's	0–2		29,132
19 April 2003	West Bromwich Albion	Stadium of Light	1–2	Stewart 70'	36,025
21 April 2003	Manchester City	Maine Road	0–3		34,357
26 April 2003	Newcastle United	Stadium of Light	0–1		45,067
3 May 2003	Aston Villa	Villa Park	0–1		36,963
11 May 2003	Arsenal	Stadium of Light	0–4		40,188

== Statistics ==
=== Overview ===
Competition	Record							
Competition	P	W	D	L	GF	GA	GD	Win %
Premier League	38	4	7	27	21	65	−44	10.53
FA Cup	5	1	3	1	8	5	+3	20.00
League Cup	3	2	0	1	10	4	+6	66.67
Total	46	7	10	29	39	74	−35	15.22

=== Appearances and goals ===
No.	Pos	Nat	Player	Total		Premier League		FA Cup		League Cup	
No.	Pos	Nat	Player	Apps	Goals	Apps	Goals	Apps	Goals	Apps	Goals
Goalkeepers
1	GK	(Denmark) DEN	Thomas Sørensen	25	0	21	0	4	0	0	0
26	GK	(Norway) NOR	Thomas Myhre	3	0	1+1	0	0	0	1	0
30	GK	(Austria) AUT	Jürgen Macho	16	0	12+1	0	1	0	2	0
40	GK	(Estonia) EST	Mart Poom	4	0	4	0	0	0	0	0
Defenders
2	DF	(England) ENG	Stephen Wright	29	0	25+1	0	3	0	0	0
3	DF	(England) ENG	Michael Gray	36	1	32	1	4	0	0	0
5	DF	(Republic of Ireland) IRL	Phil Babb	30	0	26	0	3	0	1	0
6	DF	(Brazil) BRA	Emerson Thome	5	0	1	0	2	0	2	0
12	DF	(Sweden) SWE	Joachim Björklund	22	0	19+1	0	1+1	0	0	0
17	DF	(England) ENG	Jody Craddock	30	1	25	1	4	0	1	0
18	DF	(England) ENG	Darren Williams	21	1	12+4	0	2	0	3	1
22	DF	(Morocco) MAR	Talal El Karkouri	9	0	8	0	0+1	0	0	0
25	DF	(England) ENG	Ben Clark	2	0	0+1	0	1	0	0	0
27	DF	(Northern Ireland) NIR	George McCartney	30	0	16+8	0	1+2	0	2+1	0
33	DF	(Argentina) ARG	Julio Arca	18	2	7+6	0	4	1	1	1
34	DF	(Republic of Ireland) IRL	Mark Rossiter	3	0	0	0	0+1	0	2	0
37	DF	(England) ENG	Jonjo Dickman	1	0	0+1	0	0	0	0	0
Midfielders
4	MF	(United States) USA	Claudio Reyna	12	1	11	0	0	0	1	1
7	MF	(England) ENG	Matthew Piper	14	0	8+5	0	0	0	0+1	0
8	MF	(England) ENG	Gavin McCann	35	3	29+1	1	3	1	2	1
11	MF	(Republic of Ireland) IRL	Kevin Kilbane	34	1	30	1	3	0	1	0
14	MF	(Republic of Ireland) IRL	Thomas Butler	8	0	7	0	0	0	0+1	0
16	MF	(Republic of Ireland) IRL	Jason McAteer	10	1	9	1	1	0	0	0
21	MF	(England) ENG	Paul Thirlwell	21	0	12+6	0	1	0	1+1	0
23	MF	(Argentina) ARG	Nicolás Medina	1	0	0	0	1	0	0	0
24	MF	(Republic of Ireland) IRL	Sean Thornton	14	1	11	1	3	0	0	0
28	MF	(Wales) WAL	John Oster	5	0	1+2	0	1+1	0	0	0
29	MF	(England) ENG	Chris Black	2	0	2	0	0	0	0	0
36	MF	(Republic of Ireland) IRL	Richie Ryan	2	0	0+2	0	0	0	0	0
Forwards
9	FW	(Norway) NOR	Tore André Flo	32	6	23+6	4	1+1	0	1	2
10	FW	(England) ENG	Kevin Phillips	36	9	32	6	4	3	0	0
15	FW	(France) FRA	David Bellion	14	1	5+6	1	0+1	0	2	0
19	FW	(Scotland) SCO	Kevin Kyle	22	1	9+8	0	2+1	0	2	1
31	FW	(England) ENG	Marcus Stewart	24	5	9+10	1	2	1	3	3
32	FW	(England) ENG	Michael Proctor	28	3	11+10	2	3+2	1	2	0
Players transferred out during the season
22	DF	(Slovakia) SVK	Stanislav Varga	3	0	0	0	0+1	0	2	0
29	FW	(Republic of Ireland) IRL	Niall Quinn	8	0	0+8	0	0	0	0	0

=== Goal scorers ===
Position	Nation	Number	Name	FA Premier League	League Cup	FA Cup	Total
FW	(England)	10	Kevin Phillips	6	0	3	9
FW	(England)	31	Marcus Stewart	1	4	1	6
FW	(Norway)	9	Tore André Flo	4	2	0	6
FW	(England)	32	Michael Proctor	2	0	2	4
MF	(England)	8	Gavin McCann	1	1	1	3
MF	(Argentina)	33	Julio Arca	0	1	1	2
DF	(England)	3	Micky Gray	1	0	0	1
DF	(England)	17	Jody Craddock	1	0	0	1
MF	(Republic of Ireland)	24	Sean Thornton	1	0	0	1
MF	(Republic of Ireland)	11	Kevin Kilbane	1	0	0	1
FW	(France)	15	David Bellion	1	0	0	1
MF	(Republic of Ireland)	16	Jason McAteer	1	0	0	1
FW	(Scotland)	19	Kevin Kyle	0	1	0	1
MF	(United States)	4	Claudio Reyna	0	1	0	1
			Own goal	1	0	0	1
/	/	/	Total	21	10	8	39
