= 2003–04 Sunderland A.F.C. season =

English football club season

Sunderland
2003–04 season
- Chairman: Bob Murray
- Manager: Mick McCarthy
- Stadium: Stadium of Light
- First Division: 3rd
- Play-offs: Semi-finals
- FA Cup: Semi-finals
- League Cup: Second round
- Top goalscorer: Marcus Stewart (16)

During the 2003–04 English football season, Sunderland A.F.C. competed in the Football League First Division.

== Season summary ==
While the dismal ending to the previous season, combined with losses in their opening two matches lead to fears that Sunderland might spend the season battling a second successive relegation, a run of 7 wins from their next 10 matches quickly ended any such fears. A couple of spells of indifferent form meant that the club didn't convincingly challenge for automatic promotion until the closing stages of the season, and then another poor run of form in the season's closing stages, including the loss of a six-pointer to fellow promotion hopefuls West Bromwich Albion, just as quickly ended any such hopes. Sunderland were still considered favourites going into the play-offs, but a loss on penalties to Crystal Palace, who had gate-crashed the play-offs on the final day of the season, meant a second season in Division One (or, as it would be re-branded the following season, the Championship).

== Transfers ==
=== In ===
==== Summer ====
Date	Pos	Name	From	Fee
4 August 2003	MF	(Northern Ireland) Jeff Whitley	(England) Manchester City	Free
5 August 2003	DF	(Republic of Ireland) Gary Breen	(England) West Ham United	Free
25 September 2003	MF	(England) Tommy Smith	(England) Watford	Free
3 October 2003	MF	(Republic of Ireland) Alan Quinn	(England) Sheffield Wednesday	Loan
30 October 2003	MF	(England) Stewart Downing	(England) Middlesbrough	Loan

==== January ====
Date	Pos	Name	From	Fee
7 January 2004	MF	(England) Kevin Cooper	(England) Wolverhampton Wanderers	Loan
6 February 2004	FW	(Jamaica) Darren Byfield	(England) Rotherham United	Swap with Michael Proctor
12 March 2004	DF	(England) Colin Cooper	(England) Middlesbrough	Loan
24 March 2004	MF	(Wales) Carl Robinson	(England) Portsmouth	Loan

=== Out ===
==== Summer ====
Date	Pos	Name	To	Fee
1 June 2003	MF	(Sweden) Stefan Schwarz	Retired	Retired
11 June 2003	DF	(Republic of Ireland) Cliff Byrne	(England) Scunthorpe United	Free
1 July 2003	FW	(France) David Bellion	(England) Manchester United	Free
3 July 2003	GK	(Austria) Jurgen Macho	(England) Chelsea	Free
9 July 2003	FW	(France) Lilian Laslandes	(France) Nice	Free
9 July 2003	DF	(Switzerland) Bernt Haas (Note: Haas was born in Vienna, Austria, but also qualified to represent Switzerland internationally and made his international debut for Switzerland in 1996.)	(England) West Bromwich Albion	£400,000
24 July 2003	MF	(England) Gavin McCann	(England) Aston Villa	£2.25 million
31 July 2003	DF	(England) Jody Craddock	(England) Wolverhampton Wanderers	£1.75 million
8 August 2003	GK	(Denmark) Thomas Sorensen	(England) Aston Villa	£2.25 million
14 August 2003	FW	(England) Kevin Phillips	(England) Southampton	£3.25 million
20 August 2003	MF	(Argentina) Nicolás Medina	(Spain) Leganés	Season-long loan
23 August 2003	FW	(Norway) Tore André Flo	(Italy) Siena	Undisclosed
29 August 2003	MF	(United States) Claudio Reyna	(England) Manchester City	£2.5 million
29 August 2003	DF	(Brazil) Emerson Thome	(England) Bolton Wanderers	Free
1 September 2003	MF	(Republic of Ireland) Kevin Kilbane (Note: Kilbane was born in Preston, England, but also qualified to represent the Republic of Ireland internationally through his parents and represented them at U-21 level before making his international debut for Republic of Ireland in September 1997.)	(England) Everton	£1 million
1 September 2003	DF	(England) Michael Gray	(Scotland) Celtic	Four-month loan (September to December)
25 September 2003	FW	(Republic of Ireland) Keith Graydon	(England) Scarborough	Free
3 October 2003	FW	(Republic of Ireland) Michael Reddy	(England) Sheffield Wednesday	Loan
3 October 2003	FW	(England) Chris Brown	(England) Doncaster Rovers	Loan
23 October 2003	GK	(Norway) Thomas Myhre	(England) Crystal Palace	Loan
13 November 2003	DF	(England) Craig James	(England) Darlington	Loan

==== January ====
Date	Pos	Name	From	Fee
27 January 2004	DF	(England) Michael Gray	(England) Blackburn Rovers	Free
6 February 2004	FW	(Northern Ireland) Neil Teggart	(England) Darlington	Loan
6 February 2004	FW	(England) Michael Proctor	(England) Rotherham United	Swap for Darren Byfield
25 February 2004	MF	(England) Jonjo Dickman	(England) York City	Loan
15 March 2004	GK	(Northern Ireland) Michael Ingham	(Wales) Wrexham	Loan
19 March 2004	DF	(England) Craig James	(England) Port Vale	Loan
25 March 2004	MF	(England) Chris Black	(England) Doncaster Rovers	Free

== Players ==
=== First-team squad ===
Squad at end of season

Note: Flags indicate national team as defined under FIFA eligibility rules; some limited exceptions apply. Players may hold more than one non-FIFA nationality.

No.	Pos.	Nation	Player
1	GK	EST	Mart Poom
2	DF	ENG	Stephen Wright
3	DF	NIR	George McCartney
4	MF	IRL	Jason McAteer (Note: McAteer was born in Tranmere, England, but also qualified to represent the Republic of Ireland internationally and made his international debut for the Republic of Ireland in March 1994.)
5	DF	IRL	Gary Breen (Note: Breen was born in Barnet, England, but also qualified to represent the Republic of Ireland internationally and made his international debut for the Republic of Ireland in May 1996.)
6	DF	ENG	Ben Clark
7	MF	ENG	Matt Piper
8	MF	NIR	Jeff Whitley (Note: Whitley was born in Ndola, Zambia, but was raised in England and also qualified to represent Northern Ireland internationally through his father. He represented England at U-17 level and Northern Ireland at U-21 level before making his international debut for Northern Ireland in 1997.)
9	FW	SCO	Kevin Kyle
10	FW	ENG	Marcus Stewart
11	FW	ENG	Tommy Smith
12	MF	WAL	John Oster (Note: Oster was born in Boston, England, but also qualified to represent Wales internationally and represented them at U-18 and U-21 level before making his international debut for Wales in 1997.)
13	GK	NIR	Michael Ingham (Note: Ingham was born in Preston, England, but also qualified to represent Northern Ireland internationally and represented them at U-18 and U-21 level before making his international debut for Northern Ireland in June 2005.)

No.	Pos.	Nation	Player
15	MF	IRL	Sean Thornton
16	DF	ENG	Darren Williams
17	FW	JAM	Darren Byfield (Note: Byfield was born in Sutton Coldfield, England, but also qualified to represent Jamaica internationally and made his international debut for Jamaica in 2003.)
18	DF	IRL	Phil Babb (Note: Babb was born in Lambeth, England, but also qualified to represent the Republic of Ireland internationally and made his international debut for the Republic of Ireland in 1994.)
20	MF	IRL	Thomas Butler
21	MF	ENG	Paul Thirlwell
22	DF	SWE	Joachim Björklund
24	MF	WAL	Carl Robinson (on loan from Portsmouth)
25	MF	IRL	Colin Healy
30	MF	ENG	Grant Leadbitter
33	DF	ARG	Julio Arca
36	DF	ENG	Simon Ramsden
40	GK	NOR	Thomas Myhre

=== Left club during season ===
Note: Flags indicate national team as defined under FIFA eligibility rules; some limited exceptions apply. Players may hold more than one non-FIFA nationality.

No.	Pos.	Nation	Player
11	MF	IRL	Kevin Kilbane (to Everton)
14	FW	ENG	Michael Proctor (to Rotherham United)
14	DF	ENG	Colin Cooper (on loan from Middlesbrough)
17	DF	ENG	Michael Gray (to Blackburn Rovers)
19	FW	ENG	Kevin Phillips (to Southampton)
19	MF	IRL	Alan Quinn (on loan from Sheffield Wednesday)
19	MF	ENG	Kevin Cooper (on loan from Wolves)

No.	Pos.	Nation	Player
23	MF	ENG	Chris Black (to Doncaster Rovers)
24	MF	USA	Claudio Reyna (to Manchester City)
24	MF	ENG	Stewart Downing (on loan from Middlesbrough)
29	FW	NOR	Tore André Flo (to Siena)
34	DF	ENG	Craig James (to Port Vale)
37	DF	BRA	Emerson Thome (to Bolton Wanderers)
42	MF	ARG	Nicolás Medina (on loan to Leganés)

=== Reserves ===
The following players did not appear for the first-team this season.

Note: Flags indicate national team as defined under FIFA eligibility rules; some limited exceptions apply. Players may hold more than one non-FIFA nationality.

No.	Pos.	Nation	Player
26	MF	ENG	Jonjo Dickman
27	MF	IRL	Richie Ryan
28	DF	ENG	Patrick Collins
31	FW	ENG	Chris Brown
32	DF	IRL	Mark Rossiter
35	DF	ENG	Chris Scott

No.	Pos.	Nation	Player
38	MF	NIR	Chris Kingsberry
39	FW	NIR	Neil Teggart
41	GK	ENG	Ben Alnwick
42	GK	SCO	Euan McLean
43	FW	IRL	Michael Reddy
—	DF	ENG	Sean Taylor

== Results ==
Sunderland's score comes first.

Win	Draw	Loss

=== League Cup ===
Date	Round	Opponent	Venue	Result	Attendance	Scorers
12 August 2003	First round	Mansfield Town	Field Mill	2-1	5,665	Kyle, Artell (own goal)
23 September 2003	Second round	Huddersfield Town	Stadium of Light	2-4	13,516	Kyle (2)

=== FA Cup ===
Date	Round	Opponent	Venue	Result	Attendance	Scorers
2 January 2004	Third round	Hartlepool United	Stadium of Light	1-0	40,816	Arca
24 January 2004	Fourth round	Ipswich Town	Portman Road	2-1	21,406	Smith, Arca
14 February 2004	Fifth round	Birmingham City	Stadium of Light	1-1	24,966	Kyle
25 February 2004	Fifth round replay	Birmingham City	St Andrew's	2-0 (after extra time)	25,645	Smith (2)
7 March 2004	Quarter-final	Sheffield United	Stadium of Light	1-0	37,115	Smith
4 April 2004	Semi-final	Millwall	Old Trafford	0-1	56,112	

=== Football League First Division ===
==== League table ====
Pos	Team	Pld	W	D	L	GF	GA	GD	Pts	Promotion, qualification or relegation
1	Norwich City (C, P)	46	28	10	8	79	39	+40	94	Promotion to the FA Premier League
2	West Bromwich Albion (P)	46	25	11	10	64	42	+22	86	Promotion to the FA Premier League
3	Sunderland	46	22	13	11	62	45	+17	79	Qualification for the First Division play-offs
4	West Ham United	46	19	17	10	67	45	+22	74	Qualification for the First Division play-offs
5	Ipswich Town	46	21	10	15	84	72	+12	73	Qualification for the First Division play-offs

Source: Soccerway
Rules for classification: 1) points; 2) goal difference; 3) number of goals scored.
(C) Champions; (P) Promoted

==== Results summary ====
Overall								Home						Away					
Pld	W	D	L	GF	GA	GD	Pts	W	D	L	GF	GA	GD	W	D	L	GF	GA	GD
46	22	13	11	62	45	+17	79	13	8	2	33	15	+18	9	5	9	29	30	−1

Last updated: 4 December 2018.
Source: 11v11

==== Results by matchday ====
Round	1	2	3	4	5	6	7	8	9	10	11	12	13	14	15	16	17	18	19	20	21	22	23	24	25	26	27	28	29	30	31	32	33	34	35	36	37	38	39	40	41	42	43	44	45	46
Ground	A	H	A	H	A	H	A	A	H	H	A	H	H	H	A	A	A	H	A	H	H	A	A	H	H	A	H	A	A	A	A	H	H	H	A	H	H	A	H	A	H	A	A	H	H	A
Result	L	L	W	W	W	W	L	D	W	W	W	D	W	D	L	D	W	D	L	D	D	D	L	W	W	W	W	L	D	L	W	D	W	D	W	W	W	W	W	L	L	L	D	D	W	W
Position	21	23	17	8	7	4	8	9	5	5	4	4	4	4	5	5	4	5	5	8	6	6	10	8	5	4	4	4	6	7	9	9	7	7	6	4	3	3	3	3	3	3	3	4	3	3

A = Away; H = Home; W = Win; D = Draw; L = Loss

Date	Opponent	Venue	Result	Attendance	Scorers
9 August 2003	Nottingham Forest	City Ground	0-2	23,529	
16 August 2003	Millwall	Stadium of Light	0-1	24,877	
23 August 2003	Preston North End	Deepdale	2-0	14,080	Thornton, Stewart
25 August 2003	Watford	Stadium of Light	2-0	23,600	Wright, Stewart (pen)
30 August 2003	Bradford City	Valley Parade	4-0	14,116	Thornton, Stewart, Arca, Breen
13 September 2003	Crystal Palace	Stadium of Light	2-1	27,324	Kyle, Stewart (pen)
16 September 2003	Stoke City	Britannia Stadium	1-3	15,005	Kyle
20 September 2003	Derby County	Pride Park	1-1	22,535	Poom
26 September 2003	Reading	Stadium of Light	2-0	22,420	Arca, Oster
30 September 2003	Ipswich Town	Stadium of Light	3-2	24,840	Breen, Oster, Kyle
4 October 2003	Sheffield United	Bramall Lane	1-0	27,008	Kyle
14 October 2003	Cardiff City	Stadium of Light	0-0	26,835	
18 October 2003	Walsall	Stadium of Light	1-0	36,278	Stewart
21 October 2003	Rotherham United	Stadium of Light	0-0	24,506	
25 October 2003	Norwich City	Carrow Road	0-1	16,427	
1 November 2003	West Bromwich Albion	The Hawthorns	0-0	26,135	
4 November 2003	Gillingham	Priestfield Stadium	3-1	9,066	Downing, Oster, Stewart
8 November 2003	Coventry City	Stadium of Light	0-0	27,247	
22 November 2003	Crewe Alexandra	Gresty Road	3-0	9,807	
29 November 2003	Burnley	Stadium of Light	1-1	29,852	Kyle
2 December 2003	Wigan Athletic	Stadium of Light	1-1	22,167	Downing (pen)
8 December 2003	Coventry City	Highfield Road	1-1	12,913	Downing
13 December 2003	West Ham United	Boleyn Ground	2-3	30,329	Oster, McAteer
20 December 2003	Wimbledon	Stadium of Light	2-1	22,334	Proctor, Stewart (pen)
26 December 2003	Bradford City	Stadium of Light	3-0	29,639	McAteer, Smith, Kyle
28 December 2003	Rotherham United	Millmoor	2-0	11,455	Stewart (2, 1 pen)
10 January 2004	Nottingham Forest	Stadium of Light	1-0	26,340	Arca
17 January 2004	Millwall	The Den	1-2	13,048	Stewart
7 February 2004	Watford	Vicarage Road	2-2	16,798	Stewart, Byfield
21 February 2004	Cardiff City	Ninian Park	0-4	17,337	
3 March 2004	Walsall	Bescot Stadium	3-1	7,185	Arca, Stewart, Kyle
10 March 2004	Preston North End	Stadium of Light	3-3	27,181	Stewart (pen), Thornton, Mears (own goal)
13 March 2004	West Ham United	Stadium of Light	2-0	29,533	Whitley, Kyle
16 March 2004	Stoke City	Stadium of Light	1-1	24,510	Byfield
20 March 2004	Reading	Madjeski Stadium	2-0	18,019	Byfield, Smith
23 March 2004	Gillingham	Stadium of Light	2-1	23,262	Byfield, Thornton
27 March 2004	Derby County	Stadium of Light	2-1	30,838	Smith, Oster
6 April 2004	Wimbledon	National Hockey Stadium	2-1	4,800	Byfield, Stewart
9 April 2004	Sheffield United	Stadium of Light	3-0	27,472	Breen, Smith, Kyle
12 April 2004	Ipswich Town	Portman Road	0-1	26,801	
18 April 2004	West Bromwich Albion	Stadium of Light	0-1	32,201	
21 April 2004	Crystal Palace	Selhurst Park	0-3	18,291	
24 April 2004	Wigan Athletic	JJB Stadium	0-0	11,380	
1 May 2004	Crewe Alexandra	Stadium of Light	1-1	25,311	Whitley
4 May 2004	Norwich City	Stadium of Light	1-0	35,174	Robinson
9 May 2004	Burnley	Turf Moor	2-1	18,252	Breen, Kyle

=== Football League First Division play-offs ===
Date	Leg	Opponent	Venue	Result	Attendance	Scorers
14 May 2004	Leg 1	Crystal Palace	Selhurst Park	2–3	25,287	Kyle, Stewart (pen)
17 May 2004	Leg 2	Crystal Palace	Stadium of Light	2–1 (4–4 on aggregate, Sunderland lost 5–4 on penalties)	34,536	Kyle, Stewart

== Goal scorers ==
Position	Nation	Number	Name	League	League Cup	FA Cup	Total
FW	(England)	10	Marcus Stewart	16	0	0	16
FW	(Scotland)	9	Kevin Kyle	12	3	1	16
MF	(England)	11	Tommy Smith	4	0	4	8
MF	(Argentina)	33	Julio Arca	4	0	2	6
FW	(Jamaica)	17	Darren Byfield	5	0	0	5
MF	(Wales)	12	John Oster	5	0	0	5
MF	(Republic of Ireland)	15	Sean Thornton	4	0	0	4
DF	(Republic of Ireland)	5	Gary Breen	4	0	0	4
MF	(England)	24	Stewart Downing	3	0	0	3
MF	(Republic of Ireland)	4	Jason McAteer	2	0	0	2
MF	(Northern Ireland)	8	Jeff Whitley	2	0	0	2
/	/	/	Own goals	1	1	0	2
MF	(Wales)	24	Carl Robinson	1	0	0	1
DF	(England)	2	Stephen Wright	1	0	0	1
GK	(Estonia)	1	Mart Poom	1	0	0	1
FW	(England)	14	Michael Proctor	1	0	0	1
/	/	/	Totals	62	4	7	73
