= Julio Arca =

Argentine footballer (born 1981)

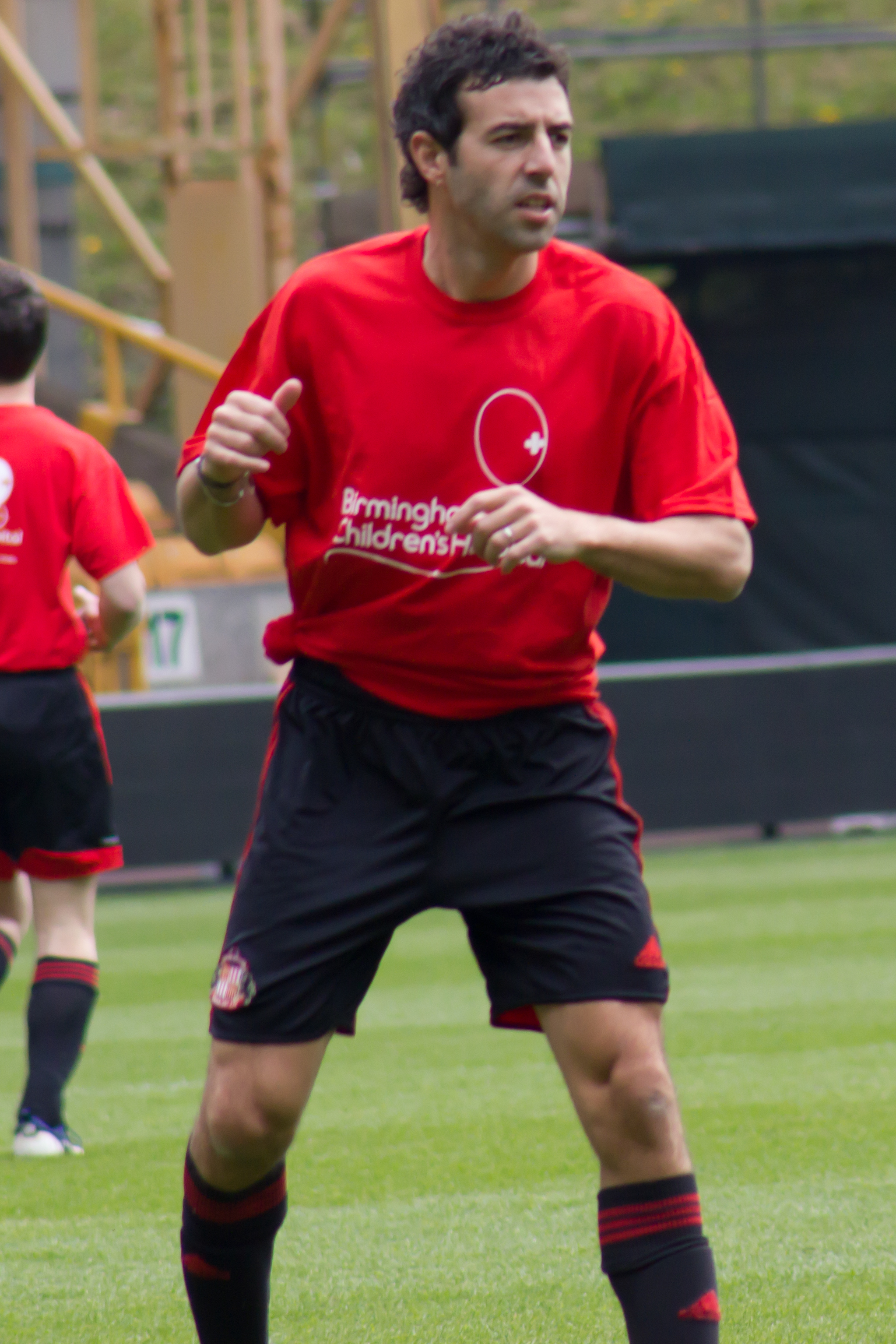
- Arca warming up for Sunderland in 2014

Personal information
- Full name: Julio Andrés Arca
- Date of birth: 31 January 1981 (age 45)
- Place of birth: Quilmes, Argentina
- Height: 5 ft 9 in (1.75 m)
- Positions: Central midfielder; left wing back

Youth career
- 1992–1999: Argentinos Juniors

Senior career*
Years	Team	Apps	(Gls)
1998–2000	Argentinos Juniors	36	(0)
2000–2006	Sunderland	157	(17)
2006–2013	Middlesbrough	160	(9)
2015–2018	South Shields		

International career
2001	Argentina U20	12	(2)
2000	Argentina U21	1	(0)

Managerial career
- 2023: South Shields
- * Club domestic league appearances and goals

Julio Andrés Arca (born 31 January 1981) is an Argentine former professional footballer, who played as a left-back or central midfielder. He was most recently manager of South Shields.

Arca spent the majority of his career in the North East of England, firstly for Sunderland from 2000 to 2006, and then for Middlesbrough from 2006 to 2013. He retired from professional football following his release from Middlesbrough, and subsequently played Sunday League football for Willow Pond for the 2014–15 season. He later signed for South Shields, in addition to his return to Sunderland as part of the club's youth coaching staff.

During his professional career, he was seen as an attack-minded player, with his key attributes including good long and short passing, as well as being a hard worker. Throughout his career at Sunderland and Middlesbrough, Arca has gained a cult following among supporters at Sunderland, Middlesbrough and South Shields.

== Club career ==
=== Argentinos Juniors ===
Born in Quilmes, Argentina, Arca began playing football when he was eleven and joined Argentinos Juniors when he was fourteen. He went on to progress at the Argentinos Juniors’ academy and made his debut three years later at age seventeen; which saw his side lose 7–1 loss against Independiente. Arca made thirty–six appearances during his time there, having broken into the first team at age eighteen. He said playing in Argentina was tough, but acknowledged that it gave him a “great education”.

=== Sunderland ===
Sunderland's manager Peter Reid signed Arca in 2000 from Argentinos Juniors with a £3.5 million five-year deal, while holding off competition from Newcastle United and Leeds United. It came after Peter Reid spotted him in a U21 match playing against England at Craven Cottage and tracked him until completing the signing in July 2000. Upon joining the club, Arca was Reid's most expensive signing of that summer and was then second only behind Stefan Schwarz as the club's record buy. The youngster was tipped for the brightest of futures and full international honours.

Having missed the first three league matches, due to receiving his Italian passport, he was an immediate success, scoring on his debut at the Stadium of Light against West Ham United. Arca then helped the side keep four consecutive clean sheets throughout October. The following month, he only played three matches, including scoring against Manchester United, due to his international commitment with Argentina U20. Arca's third goal of the season came on 1 January 2001, in a 4–1 win over Ipswich Town. However, he missed five matches throughout January because of his continuous international commitment with Argentina U20. It wasn't until on 10 February 2001 when Arca made his return to the first team, in a 1–1 draw against Liverpool. Arca played for his previous club and national team at left-back but was successfully converted to left midfield by Reid. Arca scored three times in thirty appearances for the Black Cats in his first season in the Premiership. For his performance, he won the club's Young Player of the Year award. Arca also became a fan favourite among Sunderland supporters.

At the start of the 2001–02 season, Arca suffered a setback when he suffered a knee injury that saw him miss two matches. He made his return from injury, starting the whole game, in a 1–0 win over Blackburn Rovers on 8 September 2001. Following this, he regained his first-team place, playing in the midfield position. In a 1–1 draw against Arsenal, Arca scored a header from two minutes into injury time but was denied by referee Mike Riley after the assistant referee flagged for offside. Riley's decision to disallow Arca's goal was criticised by then-club captain Michael Gray and Manager Peter Reid. Despite that setback, Arca managed to score his first goal of the season in a 2–1 win over Leeds United on 18 November 2001. He did not manage to rediscover his form of the previous season and was out of action from February. Because of his trouble with a series of niggling injuries, Arca's 2001–02 campaign was disappointing like so many other of Sunderland's players.

At the start of the 2002–03 campaign, Arca continued to recover from the injuries he sustained from the previous season. His first appearance of the season came on 28 August 2002, coming on as a late substitute, in a 1–0 win over Leeds United. Arca, who had then played 54 games for the club, stated his determination to get back to his best – both in fitness and form, especially playing under the management of Reid's successor, Howard Wilkinson. Due to being a fan favourite among Sunderland supporters, they chanted "Julio, Julio when he was not in the squad". Despite this, Arca scored his first goal of the season, in the second round of the League Cup, in a 2–0 win over Cambridge United on 1 October 2002. He was sidelined for two months, due to an injury he sustained during the club's reserve match against Manchester United Reserve. After returning from injury in December, Arca didn't make his return to the first team until 11 January 2003, coming on as a second–half substitute, in a 0–0 draw against Blackburn Rovers. Three days later on 14 January 2003, he scored his second goal of the season, in a 2–0 win over Bolton Wanderers in the FA Cup replay. Since returning to the first team, Arca had a run in of first team for the rest of the season despite being on the sidelines on three occasions. However, in a match against West Bromwich Albion on 19 April 2003, he came on as a 19th-minute substitute, as he was unable to help the club overcome the result and they were relegated to the Football League First Division, finishing at the bottom of the Premier League. At the end of the 2002–03 season, Arca went on to make eighteen appearances and scoring twice in all competitions.

At the start of the 2003–04 season, Arca missed the first three matches, due to being linked to a move away and leaving Sunderland. His first appearance of the season came on 23 August 2003 against Preston North End, starting the whole game in the left–back position, in a 2–0 win. Having regained his first team place, playing in the left–back position, he kept two clean sheets in the next two matches, including scoring his first goal of the season, in a 4–0 win over Bradford City. Since returning to the first team, Arca regained his first-team place, playing in the left–back position. Manager Mick McCarthy and Gary Breen praised his recent performances for making a significant impact. His second goal of the season came on 27 September 2003, in a 2–0 win over Reading. A week later on 4 October 2003, however, he was sent–off for the second bookable offence, in a 1–0 win over Sheffield United. Arca was sent–off for a second bookable offence once again two months later on 2 December 2003, in a 1–1 draw against Wigan Athletic, resulting in a two-match ban. After returning to the first team, he scored three goals throughout January. In the January transfer window Arca was linked a move away from Sunderland, prompting Manager McCarthy to rule out the sale. Arca himself showed his loyalty to the club, electing to stay Following this, he then scored his fourth goal of the season, in a 3–1 win over Walsall on 3 March 2004. However, Arca missed five matches, due to a knee injury he sustained in a 1–0 win over Sheffield United in a FA Cup match. It wasn't until 27 March 2004 that he made his return to the starting line-up, in a 2–1 win over Derby County. Having regained his first team place for the next five matches, he suffered a knee injury that saw him sidelined for the rest of the 2003–04 season. At the end of the 2003–04 season, Arca went on to make thirty–seven appearances and scored six times in all competitions. For his performance, he was named PFA Team of the Year for the First Division for the 2003–04 season.

Ahead of the 2004–05 season, Arca was linked a move away from Sunderland, as Manager McCarthy predicted that he would leave the club should they failed to achieve promotion back to the Premier League. Despite this, Arca declared that he was happy to stay at Sunderland, and opened talks with the club over a new contract. At the start of the 2004–05 season, he continued as a first team regular, still playing in midfield. It wasn't until on 14 September 2004 when Arca scored his first goal of the season, in a 2–0 win over Nottingham Forest. However, he missed two matches, due to a sustained leg injury. After returning to the first team from injury, Arca then scored his second goal of the season, in a 3–1 win over Brighton & Hove Albion on 30 October 2004; followed–up by providing a hat–trick assists, in a 3–1 win over Wolverhampton Wanderers. During a 2–0 defeat against Millwall on 5 November 2004, Arca made V-signs to Millwall supporters on three occasions after being involved in a tussle with Kevin Muscat; leading the Football Association reported the allegations to the police. It was announced on 12 November 2004 that he signed a three–year contract, keeping him until 2007. By the end of 2004, he added two more goals, which were against Burnley and Leeds United. After being sidelined with another injury at the beginning of January, Arca didn't score again until on 19 February 2005, in a 2–1 loss against Brighton & Hove Albion. In a follow–up match against Rotherham United, he suffered an injury and was substituted in the 33rd minute, resulting in him missing two matches. It wasn't until on 12 March 2005 when he made his return as a substitute against Crewe Alexandra and set up the only goal in the game, in a 1–0 win. In a follow–up match, Arca scored his sixth goal of the season, in a 5–1 win over Plymouth Argyle. He later scored three more goals, including two victories over Queens Park Rangers and West Ham United. Throughout the season, Arca was arguably their best player as they returned to the Premiership under manager Mick McCarthy, winning the Football League Championship in 2004–05. At the end of the 2004–05 season, he went on to make forty–two appearances and scoring nine times in all competitions. For his performance, Arca, once again, was named in the PFA Team of the Year for the Championship team in the 2004–05 season.

At the start of the 2005–06 season, with Sunderland back in the Premier League, Arca continued to remain as first team regular, playing in the left–back position. However, the club made a poor start to the season, losing the first five league matches. He then scored his first goal of the season, in a 2–0 win over Middlesbrough, giving Sunderland their first Premier League since 2002. However, Arca suffered a toe injury during training and missed two matches. It wasn't until on 23 October 2005 when he returned to the first team, coming on as a second–half substitute, in a 3–2 loss against rivals, Newcastle United. His return was short–lived when he once again injured his toe after the match and was sidelined for a month. It wasn't until on 10 December 2005 when Arca returned to the starting line-up, playing the whole game, in a 2–0 loss against Charlton Athletic. Since returning to the first team, he quickly regained his place in the starting eleven, playing either the left–back position or midfield position over the season. In the January transfer window, Arca was linked a move away from the club, which he responded by stating that he has no intention of leaving Sunderland. Amid to the transfer move, Arca then scored his second goal of the season, in a 2–1 loss against Brentford in the fourth round of the FA Cup. During a 4–1 loss against rivals Newcastle United on 17 April 2006, he collided with Alan Shearer, resulting in him tearing his knee injury. However, he suffered injuries on three occasions later in the 2005–06 season. Sunderland were relegated again in the 2005–06 season. At the end of the season, Arca went on to make twenty–six appearances and scoring two times in all competitions.

Arca's departure from Sunderland was announced in April 2006. He stated that he would not play in the Championship again should the club be relegated. By the time he departed Sunderland, he made 177 appearances and scored 23 times for the side in all competitions. Five years later, Arca was named Solid Gold XI on the club's website.

=== Middlesbrough ===
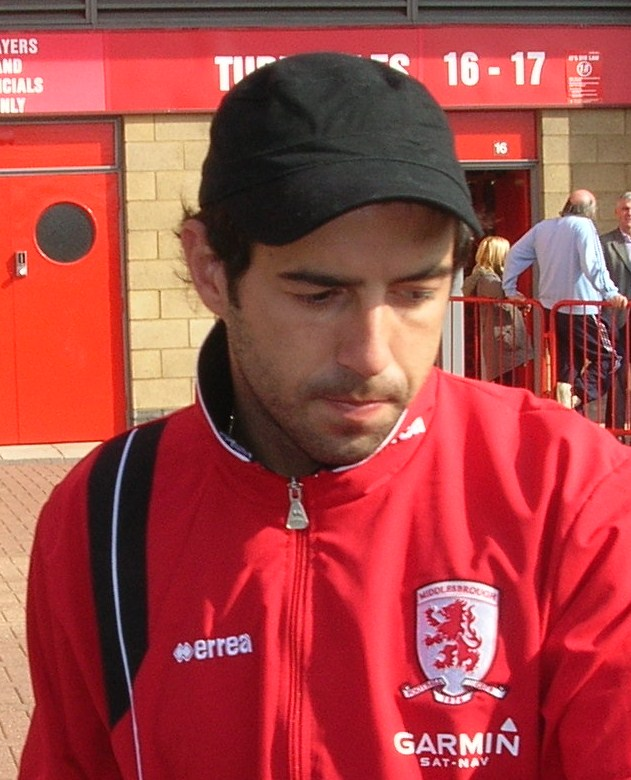
Arca with Middlesbrough in 2008

On 26 July 2006, following Sunderland's relegation from Premier League, it was announced that Arca had signed a five-year contract with Premier League side Middlesbrough, for a reported transfer fee of £1.75 million, becoming new manager Gareth Southgate's first ever senior signing; they beat Spanish club Espanyol to signing the player. He was a replacement for Franck Queudrue, who moved to Fulham.

Arca made his Premier League debut for Middlesbrough against Reading on the opening day of the 2006–07 season; he broke his foot and was substituted at half-time for Andrew Davies. After regaining fitness, Arca made his return to the first team, coming on as a late substitute, in a 1–0 win over Everton on 14 October 2006. With the progress of Andrew Taylor at left-back, Arca had been utilised as central midfielder. He scored his first goal for the club against Charlton Athletic on 23 December 2006. Arca then scored against Charlton Athletic for the second time this season, in a 3–1 win. His third goal of the season came on 17 February 2007, in a 2–2 draw against West Bromwich Albion in the fifth round of the FA Cup; leading to a FA Cup, which they won on penalties and Arca was one of the players successfully convert. He set up an equaliser goal for Lee Cattermole, in a 2–2 draw against Manchester United in the sixth round of the FA Cup; leading to a FA Cup replay once again, which Middlesbrough lost 1–0. However, Arca suffered a groin injury that saw him sidelined for a month. It wasn't until on 28 April 2007 when he returned from injury, coming on as a substitute during the second half, in a 3–2 loss against Tottenham Hotspur. Arca later featured the remaining two matches of the season. At the end of the 2006–07 season, he went on to make twenty–eight appearances and scoring three times in all competitions.

Ahead of the 2007–08 season, Arca was subjected of a transfer bid from his former club, Sunderland when they made a £2 million bid but Middlesbrough turned down the offer. Amid the transfer speculation, Arca continued to remain his first team place, playing in the midfield position at the start of the season. He then set up the opening goal for Mido, in a 2–1 win over Fulham on 18 August 2007. Arca scored his first goal for the club in a follow–up match against Tyne–Tees rivals, Newcastle United. A month later on 22 September 2007, he scored his second goal of the season, in a 2–2 draw against Sunderland. During the match, he is still liked strongly by most Sunderland fans despite moving to their local rivals and in the 2007 Tees–Wear derby at the Riverside, when he went off injured after scoring against them, he was cheered by the visiting Sunderland supporters. Unfortunately, following this injury that saw him out for two months, Arca struggled to regain his excellent form in the months prior to it. It wasn't until on 9 December 2007 when he made his return from injury, coming on as a late substitute, in a 2–1 win over Arsenal. Arca continued to regain his first team place since returning from injury. In January 2008, Arca was named club captain, replacing George Boateng. His first game as captain was against Blackburn Rovers in the Premier League in a 1–1 draw. After only a few games leading the team, he was replaced by Emanuel Pogatetz. By March, Arca was dropped from the first team by Manager Gareth Southgate, which he said: "I felt with Julio he just needs that break from the team. He's a fantastic player, he's very much with us and he understands why I left him out". It wasn't until on 6 April 2008 when he returned to the first team, starting the whole game, in a 2–2 draw against Manchester United. Since returning from injury, Arca continued to regained his first team for remaining matches of the 2007–08 season. He also assisted two matches in the last three remaining matches of the season, against Sunderland and Manchester City. At the end of the 2007–08 season, Arca went on to make twenty–nine appearances and scoring two times in all competitions.

Ahead of the 2008–09 season, Arca switched number shirt from three to twenty. However, he suffered ankle injury during a 3–2 win over Hibernian in a friendly match and was sidelined for two months as a result. It wasn't until on 29 October 2008 when he made his return to the first team from injury, coming on as a substitute in the 75th minute, in a 2–0 win over Manchester City. Since returning to the first team, Arca regained back his first team place, playing in the midfield position over the months. But in mid–January, Arca lost his first team place when suffered an illness that saw him miss one match, followed up by being placed on the substitute bench, as he continued to regain his fitness. Arca made his return to the starting line-up, playing the whole game, in a 1–1 draw against West Ham United in the fifth round of the FA Cup; which Middlesbrough went through in the FA Cup replay by beating them 2–0. Towards the end of the 2008–09 season, he suffered a hamstring injury that saw him out for a month. It wasn't until on 16 May 2009 when Arca made his return to the starting line-up, in a 1–1 draw against Aston Villa. The last game of the season against West Ham United, however, saw them lose 2–1, resulting in their relegation to the Championship in eleven years. At the end of the 2008–09 season, he went on to make twenty–one appearances in all competitions.

Ahead of the 2009–10 season, Arca said that he would leave Middlesbrough if he wasn't getting first team football at the club. But Arca suffered an injury at the start of the season that saw his playing time restricted. He soon regained his first team place, playing in the midfield position since regaining fitness. Arca then set up the opening goal in the game for Leroy Lita, in a 1–1 draw against Nottingham Forest on 21 November 2009; which was followed up by setting a goal for Dave Kitson, who scored twice in the game, in a 2–2 draw against Peterborough United. He found himself in a competition with Adam Johnson, which saw Arca placed on the substitute bench and this lasted until Johnson's departure to Manchester City in January. However, Arca, himself, was plagued with injuries that saw him miss four matches at the beginning of 2010. It wasn't until on 16 February 2010 when he made his return to the first team from injury, coming on as a second–half substitute, in a 2–0 loss against Blackpool. After missing one match, Arca made a return to the first team against Watford, where he set up an equalising goal for Lita, in a 1–1 draw. At the end of the 2009–10 season, which saw Arca make thirty–six appearances in all competitions, the club failed to gain promotion from the Championship.

Ahead of the 2010–11 season, it was announced that Arca would stay at the club, having joined the club's pre–season tour. Arca started the season well when he set up the opening goal for Scott McDonald, in a 3–1 loss against Ipswich Town in the opening game of the season. Arca then scored in Middlesbrough's 2–1 win over Chesterfield in the League Cup and scoring his first league goal for over three years from a penalty kick, to give Middlesbrough a 1–0 victory over Cardiff City. This proved to be a turning point for him, as he regained fine form towards the end of 2010. Arca suffered two injuries throughout October. Over time through the season, Arca played in both the left–back position and midfield position. Arca then assisted three goals in three matches between 28 December 2010 and 3 January 2011 against Preston North End, Leeds United and Norwich City. It wasn't until on 23 April 2011 when he scored his second of the season against Hull City and later that week, he scored his third of the campaign on a 2–1 win over Coventry City. Despite being absent on three occasions later in the season, Arca made thirty–five appearances and scoring four times in all competitions. At the end of the 2010–11 season, he was voted the club's supporters' and players' Player of the Year. Arca was also named Middlesbrough's player of the year and Team of the Season by the local newspaper, The Northern Echo.

His contract ended at the end of the 2010–11 season, having announced in February that he would leave. Arca previously stated that he would take a pay cut to stay at Middlesbrough. But mid–June, he was offered a new contract on reduced terms. On 1 July 2011, Arca was officially a free agent, though Manager Tony Mowbray did not ruled out a return to sign him. After turning down a chance to return to Boca Juniors, Arca re-signed with a two-year contract on 12 August 2011, having previously been released at the beginning of that same transfer window

Two days after signing the contract, Arca came on as a substitute in an away league match at Leeds United and passed to Marvin Emnes to score the only goal of the game. He continued to remain involved in the first team in a number of matches since returning to the club, mostly coming on from the substitute bench. But at times, Arca was given starts in the first team in a number of matches. In a match against Cardiff City on 17 December 2011, he set up a goal for Faris Haroun (who scored earlier in the game) to score the winning goal, in a 3–2 win. In a 3–1 loss against Coventry City on 21 January 2012, Arca was sent–off at the last minute of the game for a foul on Sammy Clingan. After serving three matches, he returned to the first team in the starting line-up, in a 2–1 win over Nottingham Forest on 14 February 2012. In a follow–up against Millwall, Arca set up a goal for Curtis Main to score the third goal of the game, in a 3–1 win. Despite being sidelined during the 2011–12 season, Arca finished the season, making thirty–three appearances in all competitions.

At the start of the 2012–13 season, Arca appeared three times in the first team throughout August. However, his first team opportunities at Middlesbrough was limited and placed on the substitute bench. Arca was then sidelined with a toe injury that saw him out for months. He was never featured in the first team for the rest of the 2012–13 season. At the end of the 2012–13 season, making three appearances, Arca was released by the club.

Arca later retired from professional football after his Middlesbrough contract expired in 2013.

=== South Shields ===
Arca played for Willow Pond, a second-division pub side in the Sunderland Sunday League. In July 2015, he returned to Sunderland to join the club's youth coaching staff.

On 4 September 2015, Arca joined Northern League Division Two club South Shields. He scored on his debut for the club, in a 1–1 draw with Stokesley Sports Club at Mariners Park. He later scored a goal against Ryton & Crawcrook Albion as the Mariners won 4–0 in front of a crowd of 1,045, while his third goal for South Shields came when he scored a free-kick in a 4–0 victory at Esh Winning. Arca went on to score 12 times in his first season with the Mariners as they were promoted to Division One of the Northern League as champions.

The following season, Arca captained the side and played at the Wembley Stadium in the FA Vase Final, as they beat Cleethorpes Town 4–0. Following this, it was announced that he would signed a two–year contract with South Shields. At the end of the 2017–18 season, Arca announced his retirement from football for the second time in his career; where by the time he retired, Arca helped South Shields to three promotions and three cup wins.

== International career ==
Arca was the captain of the Argentina Youth Team which featured players like Javier Saviola, Nicolás Burdisso and Maxi Rodríguez in the same squad. He won his only U21 cap in a 1–0 friendly defeat to England on 22 February 2000. During his playing time at Argentina Youth Team, Arca said he learned under José Pékerman, who at the time was in charge of Argentina's youth sides.

After his successful first season in the Premier League with Sunderland, Arca captained the Argentina Under-20 team which won the FIFA U-20 World Cup tournament in Buenos Aires, Argentina. They beat the Ghana U-20 team 3–0 in the final to win their fourth title. Earlier in the season he had been a part of the U20 team which had finished as runners-up in the 2001 South American U20 Championship. During which, Arca scored twice for the international side.

Three years later in 2004, Arca was expected to be called up for the Summer Olympic qualification. But Sunderland refused to allow him to play in the qualification, citing his commitment to the club. He was expected to be included in the Argentina U23 squad at the 2004 Summer Olympics. Despite hopes of getting called, it was later announced that he was not included in the Argentina's squad for the Olympic Games. Although Arca expressed his disappointment of not being included, he accepted the decision being made and would focus on his commitment at Sunderland. Three years later, Arca said that he hope he would receive a call-up from the senior team; using then Premier League players Carlos Tevez and Javier Mascherano as example.

== Coaching career ==
On 27 April 2023, Arca was appointed manager of his former club South Shields following the club's promotion to the National League North. On 27 December 2023, Arca was sacked by the club after a poor run of form. A 3–1 home defeat to local rivals Blyth Spartans proved the final straw for Arca as his side slipped to 8th in the table, marking their sixth game without a win.

== Personal life ==
His father is Raúl Arca, who was also a footballer at Racing Club's Reserve Team but did not make an appearance and retired soon after, and has a younger brother. Growing up, he supported River Plate but only did so because his family were supporters of the club. However, he rarely saw the team play, as he preferred to kick a ball himself. He has Italian origins through his grandfather, which allowed him to have an Italian passport in August 2000. However, it was under scrutiny when Arca used a fake passport; which Italian Embassy in Buenos Aires responded with: "Finally, at the request of the club Julio Arca's passport was presented to immigration authorities at Heathrow Airport, who assessed and verified this in advance of his arrival."

When Arca started out at Sunderland, he struggled to speak English and had to rely on Emerson Thome to act as an interpreter. Since settling in England, he quickly to learn and speak English. Because he was a fan favourite at Sunderland, the supporters recorded a musical tribute to Arca, calling the song: Hooolio. In August 2004, Arca suffered a severe allergic reaction after being stung by a jellyfish when he was swimming in the North Sea. After he spent five years in England, he revealed that he had settled in the country.

Arca is married to his native wife, Valeria, and together, they have two children. Since moving to England, he resided in Wearside, along with his family. Following his retirement from professional football, Arca earned his UEFA B Licence, having announced his intention to become a manager in 2015. He then became a Manager of the Sunderland Under 14 side. In 2019, Arca and his family moved back to Argentina, where he started a new business, Premier Sport Division, which helps sportspeople to relocate, transporting their lives across the world when they join new clubs.

== Career statistics ==
Appearances and goals by club, season and competition
Club	Season	League			National Cup		League Cup		Total	
Club	Season	Division	Apps	Goals	Apps	Goals	Apps	Goals	Apps	Goals
Argentinos Juniors	1999–2000	Argentine Primera División	19	0	0	0	—		19	0
Argentinos Juniors	2000–01	Argentine Primera División	17	0	0	0	—		17	0
Argentinos Juniors	Total		36	0	0	0	—		36	0
Sunderland	2000–01	Premier League	27	2	1	0	2	1	30	3
Sunderland	2001–02	Premier League	22	1	1	0	1	0	24	1
Sunderland	2002–03	Premier League	13	0	4	1	1	1	18	2
Sunderland	2003–04	First Division	31	4	6	2	0	0	37	6
Sunderland	2004–05	Championship	40	9	1	0	1	0	42	9
Sunderland	2005–06	Premier League	24	1	2	1	0	0	26	2
Sunderland	Total		157	17	15	4	5	2	177	23
Middlesbrough	2006–07	Premier League	21	2	7	1	0	0	28	3
Middlesbrough	2007–08	Premier League	24	2	5	0	0	0	29	2
Middlesbrough	2008–09	Premier League	18	0	3	0	0	0	21	0
Middlesbrough	2009–10	Championship	34	0	1	0	1	0	36	0
Middlesbrough	2010–11	Championship	32	3	1	0	2	1	36	4
Middlesbrough	2011–12	Championship	28	0	1	0	2	0	31	0
Middlesbrough	2012–13	Championship	1	0	0	0	2	0	3	0
Middlesbrough	Total		160	7	18	1	7	1	185	9
Career total			353	24	33	5	12	3	398	32

== Managerial statistics ==
As of match played 26 December 2023

Managerial record by team and tenure
Team	From	To	Record					Ref.
Team	From	To	P	W	D	L	Win %	Ref.
South Shields	27 April 2023	27 December 2023	27	11	6	10	40.7	
Total			27	11	6	10	40.7	—

== Honours ==
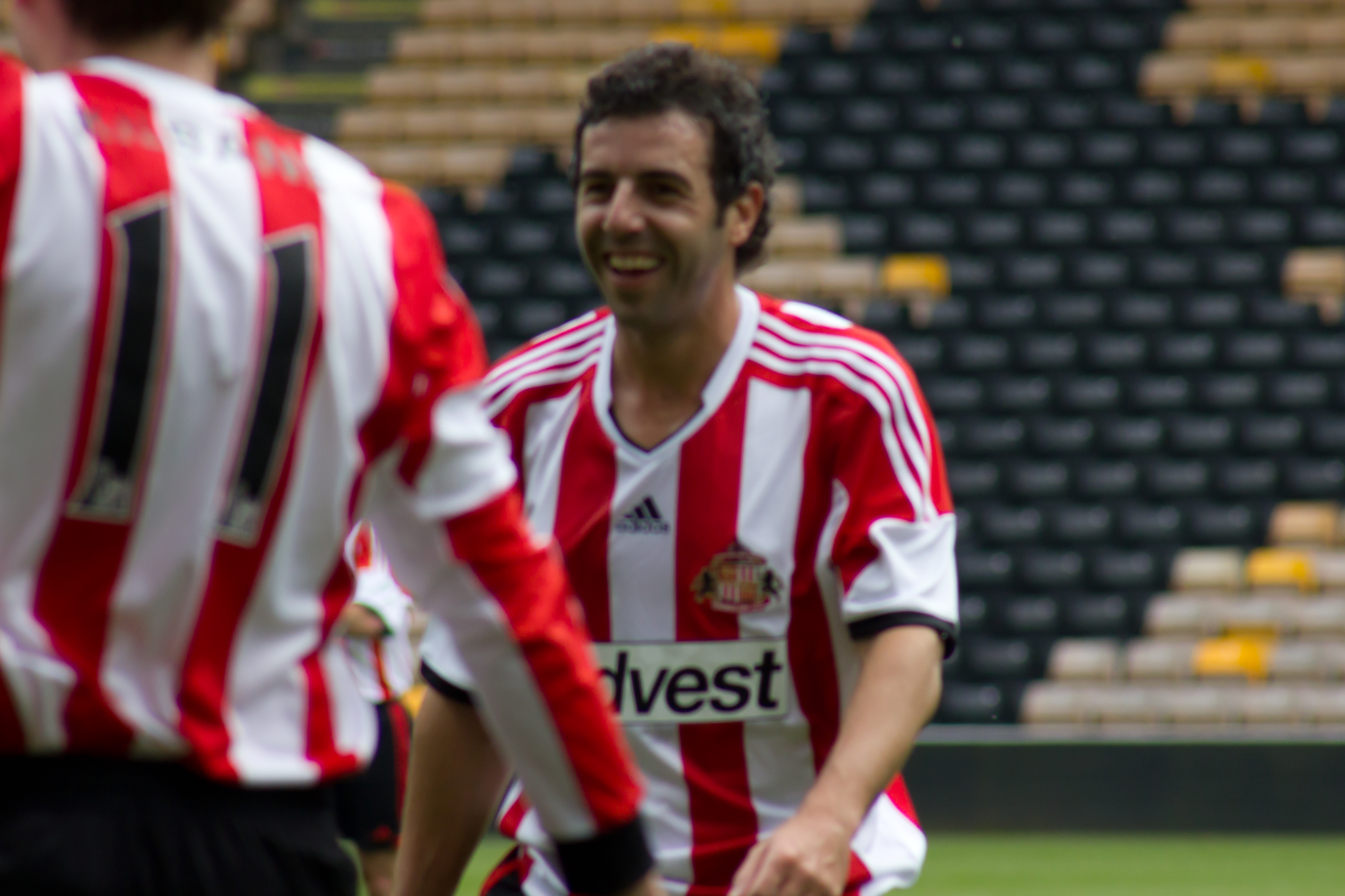
Arca playing for Sunderland in 2014

Sunderland

- Football League Championship: 2004–05

South Shields

- Northern League First Division: 2016–17
- Northern League Second Division: 2015–16
- Northern League Cup: 2016–17
- FA Vase: 2016–17

Argentina

- FIFA U-20 World Cup: 2001

Individual

- Sunderland Young Player of the Year: 2000–01
- North East Football Award – Football League Footballer of the Year: 2003–04
- PFA Team of the Year: 2003–04 First Division, 2004–05 Championship
- Middlesbrough Supporters' Player of the Year: 2010–11
- Middlesbrough Players' Player of the Year: 2010–11
- Middlesbrough Player of the Year: 2010
- Sunderland Solid Gold XI
