= Chris Black (footballer) =

English footballer

Personal information
- Full name: Christopher David Black
- Date of birth: 7 September 1982 (age 44)
- Place of birth: Ashington, England
- Position: Midfielder

Senior career*
Years	Team	Apps	(Gls)
2000–2004	Sunderland	3	(0)
2003–2004	Doncaster Rovers	1	(0)
- * Club domestic league appearances and goals

Chris Black (born 7 September 1982) is an English former professional footballer who played as a midfielder.

Black started his career at Sunderland and made two Premier League appearances for the club towards the end of the 2002–03 season. After the club's relegation to the Championship, he made one further appearance in 2003–04. He then made a deadline day switch to Doncaster Rovers on a free transfer.

Black signed for Rovers on Thursday 25 March and started the match on the Saturday, away to Oxford United at the Kassam Stadium on 27 March 2004. He was substituted in the 82nd minute for Ricky Ravenhill. This was to be his only appearance for Rovers. After this, he failed to report for training, prompting concern from his new club. It was later revealed that Black had contacted Sunderland and had returned home to "sort out some personal problems".
