= Joachim Björklund =

Swedish footballer (born 1971)

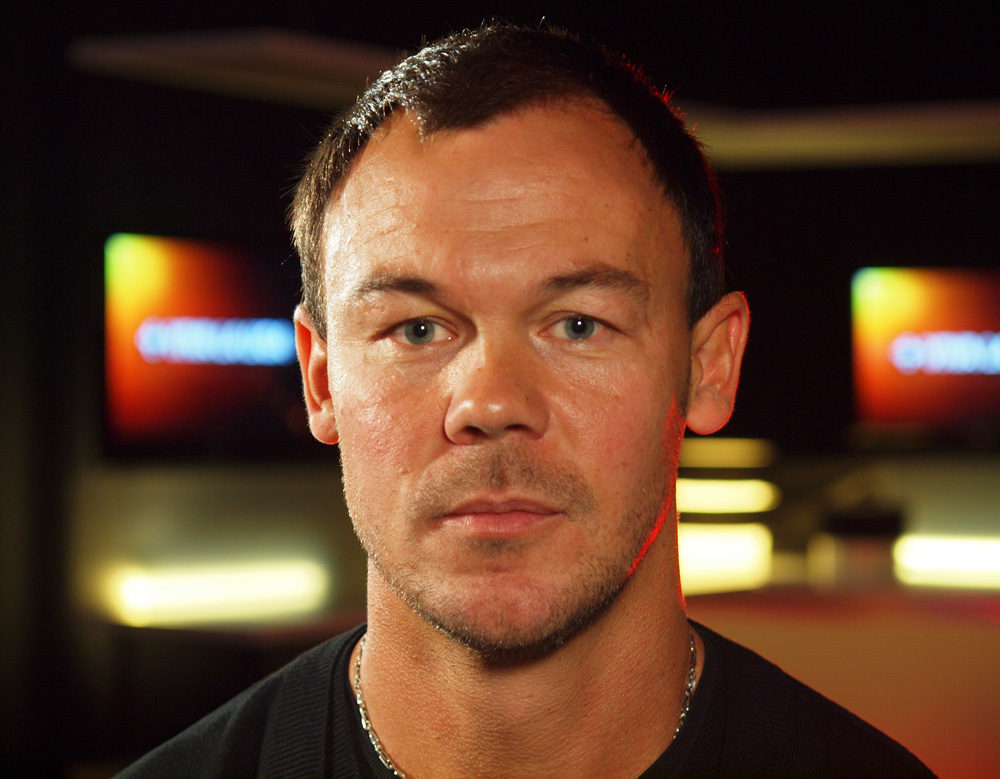
- Joachim Björklund

Personal information
- Full name: Joachim Björklund
- Date of birth: 15 March 1971 (age 55)
- Place of birth: Växjö, Sweden
- Height: 6 ft 1 in (1.85 m)
- Position: Centre back

Team information
- Current team: IFK Göteborg (head coach)

Youth career
- Östers IF

Senior career*
Years	Team	Apps	(Gls)
1989–1990	Östers IF	6	(0)
1990–1992	Brann	56	(0)
1993–1995	IFK Göteborg	46	(0)
1995–1996	Vicenza	33	(0)
1996–1998	Rangers	59	(0)
1998–2001	Valencia	57	(1)
2001–2002	Venezia	18	(0)
2002–2004	Sunderland	57	(0)
2004–2005	Wolverhampton Wanderers	3	(0)
Total		335	(1)

International career
1986–1987	Sweden U16	13	(0)
1988–1989	Sweden U18	10	(0)
1990–1992	Sweden U21/O	24	(0)
1992–2000	Sweden	78	(0)

Managerial career
- 2018–2021: Hammarby IF (assistant)
- 2022–2024: Sarpsborg 08 (assistant)
- 2024–2026: IFK Göteborg (assistant)
- 2026–: IFK Göteborg
Medal record
Sweden
FIFA World Cup
Bronze medal – third place	1994
- * Club domestic league appearances and goals

Joachim Björklund (Swedish pronunciation: [ˈjuː.a.kɪm ˈbjœr.klʉnd]; born 15 March 1971) is a Swedish football manager and former professional footballer who played as a centre back. He is currently head coach for Allsvenskan club IFK Göteborg.

Beginning his playing career with Östers IF and SK Brann, Björklund went on to win three Swedish championships with IFK Göteborg before representing clubs in the Scottish Premiership, Serie A, La Liga, and the Premier League. A full international between 1992 and 2000, Björklund won 78 caps for the Sweden national team and was a part of the teams that competed at Euro 1992, Euro 2000, and finished third at the 1994 FIFA World Cup.

== Club career ==
Taking the leap from junior team obscurity at Östers IF to becoming a star in Brann, Björklund was later sold to IFK Göteborg. There, his side achieved a surprise 3–1 victory over Manchester United in the group stage of the 1994–95 Champions League which ultimately helped them win Group A ahead of FC Barcelona, Manchester United, and Galatasaray before being eliminated in the quarter-finals by FC Bayern Munich. At the end of the following season, he was transferred to Vicenza in Serie A, and the following year to Rangers in the Scottish Premiership, for £2.2 million. where he won a Scottish league championship medal. He moved to Valencia for £2.5 million on 20 June 1998 and spent three years at Valencia before joining Venezia in Italy, where he played for just one season. While at Valencia, he helped the team reach the 1999–2000 and 2000–01 UEFA Champions League finals.

Björklund joined Sunderland in January 2002 for £1.5 million, but was unable to prevent them from being relegated in the following 2002–03 season. However the 2003–04 season was better, as he helped Sunderland finish third in Division One and reach the FA Cup semi finals yet his services were deemed to be no longer required by manager Mick McCarthy so he joined Wolverhampton Wanderers, who had just been relegated from the Premier League. He left the club and retired after just one injury-hampered season that restricted him to just five appearances in total as the club failed to win an immediate return to the top flight.

== International career ==
For many years he formed a successful central defensive partnership with Patrik Andersson for the Sweden national team. Björklund was selected for the UEFA Euro 1992, 1994 FIFA World Cup and UEFA Euro 2000. At the 1994 FIFA World Cup, he helped the team finish third behind Brazil and Italy. He was also a member of the Sweden squad that competed at the 1992 Summer Olympics in Barcelona.

Due to lack of playing time at his club Valencia, Björklund was dropped from the Sweden squad during the early stages of the 2002 FIFA World Cup qualifying. Disappointed, he decided to retire from the national team at the age of 30.

== Post-playing career ==
Having finished his playing career, he worked as a scout for Valencia, mainly targeting the Nordic countries. He also worked as a pundit for Swedish Canal+, covering La Liga football, for several years.

=== Assistant at Hammarby IF ===
On 28 January 2018, Björklund was appointed assistant coach of Hammarby IF in Allsvenskan, under head coach Stefan Billborn. In their first season, the club finished 4th in the table, after being placed first in the league mid-season.

In 2019, Hammarby started the league play in a mediocre fashion, but made a strong finish to the season (with eight straight wins during between match day 22 and 30) and ultimately finished 3rd in Allsvenskan. This meant that the club qualified for the 2020–21 UEFA Europa League, their first continental competition in over ten years.

On 5 January 2020, both Billborn and Björklund signed a three-year contract extension with Hammarby. In a season postponed due to the COVID-19 pandemic, the side disappointedly finished 8th in the table. The club won 3–0 against Puskás Akadémia in the first round of the 2020–21 UEFA Europa League, but was eliminated from the tournament in the second round against Lech Poznań through a 0–3 loss.

On 30 May 2021, Björklund won the 2020–21 Svenska Cupen with Hammarby IF, through a 5–4 win on penalties (0–0 after full-time) against BK Häcken in the final. On 11 June 2021, Hammarby decided to terminate Stefan Billborn's contract, with the club placed 8th in the 2021 Allsvenskan table after eight rounds, although Björklund stayed in his position for the rest of the year.

=== Assistant at Sarpsborg 08 ===
On 9 January 2022, Björklund reunited with Stefan Billborn, becoming his assistant coach at Sarpsborg 08 in the Norwegian Eliteserien.

=== IFK Göteborg ===
In June 2024, Björklund followed Billborn from Sarpsborg 08 back to IFK Göteborg, the club he had played for until 1995, becoming his assistant after Billborn was appointed head coach. Under Billborn, the club avoided relegation in 2024 and finished fourth in 2025, earning its first European qualification in six years.

On 27 July 2026, after Billborn left the club following an evaluation of the season's results, Björklund was appointed head coach. His first match in charge was the return leg of the 2026–27 UEFA Conference League second qualifying round away to FCI Levadia Tallinn on 30 July, where Göteborg overturned a 1–2 first-leg deficit with a 3–1 win after extra time. The club was then eliminated by Gent in the third qualifying round. In September 2026, football director Jesper Jansson stated that Björklund would lead the team in the 2027 season, while club director Nicklas Lauwell said his longer-term future would be evaluated after the season.

== Personal life ==
He is the son of Sweden national team coach Karl-Gunnar Björklund, and the father of footballers Kalle Björklund who represented Hammarby IF, Västerås SK and Falkenberg FF and William Björklund who belonged to the Hammarby youth teams and now play for United IK Nordic. His maternal uncle is Tommy Svensson, the Sweden men's national football team manager from 1991 to 1997.

== Career statistics ==
=== International ===
Appearances and goals by national team and year
National team	Year	Apps	Goals
Sweden	1992	9	0
Sweden	1993	4	0
Sweden	1994	18	0
Sweden	1995	8	0
Sweden	1996	8	0
Sweden	1997	8	0
Sweden	1998	6	0
Sweden	1999	7	0
Sweden	2000	9	0
Total		78	0

== Honours ==
=== Player ===
IFK Göteborg

- Allsvenskan: 1993, 1994, 1995

Rangers

- Scottish Premier Division: 1996–97
- Scottish League Cup: 1996–97

Valencia

- Copa del Rey: 1998–99
- Supercopa de España: 1999
- UEFA Champions League runner-up: 1999–2000, 2000–01
- UEFA Intertoto Cup: 1998

Sweden

- FIFA World Cup third place: 1994

=== Manager ===
Hammarby IF

- Svenska Cupen: 2020–21 (assistant coach)
