= Golf Punk =

British magazine

Golf Punk magazine was launched by Tim Southwell and John Dean through their Keep Yourself Nice Ltd company in 2004, after securing investment from initially Premier League footballers Michael Gray, Thomas Sørensen, Phil Babb, Jason McAteer and Stephen Wright, and then Genesis Investments (part of Chris Ingram's investment portfolio).

== History ==
Golf Punk was launched in 2004 with Tim Southwell—co-founder of Loaded alongside James Brown—serving as its editor.

Golf Punk reported an ABC circulation of 18,801 for January to June 2006.

In December 2006, JF Media acquired the publication.

In 2007, former Liverpool and Ireland footballer Phil Babb — an early investor in the magazine alongside his former Sunderland teammates Michael Gray, Thomas Sorensen, Stephen Wright, and Jason McAteer—assumed leadership of the title.

In December 2008, JF Media was bought by Montpelier Group. A sister title, Football Punk, was launched. They produced ten issues of the magazine, before the owning company went defunct and closed down the publishing company.

=== Dissolution ===
In November 2010, JF Media, the publisher of Golf Punk went out-of-business after struggling with debts of more than $1 million.

=== Relaunch ===
GolfPunk magazine was restarted in August 2012 as a digital-only version by the original founders, Tim Southwell and John Dean. Shaun McGuckian returned as deputy editor for the digital magazine.

Their website was launched at GolfPunkHQ.com in July 2015.
