= Stephen Wright (English footballer) =

English footballer

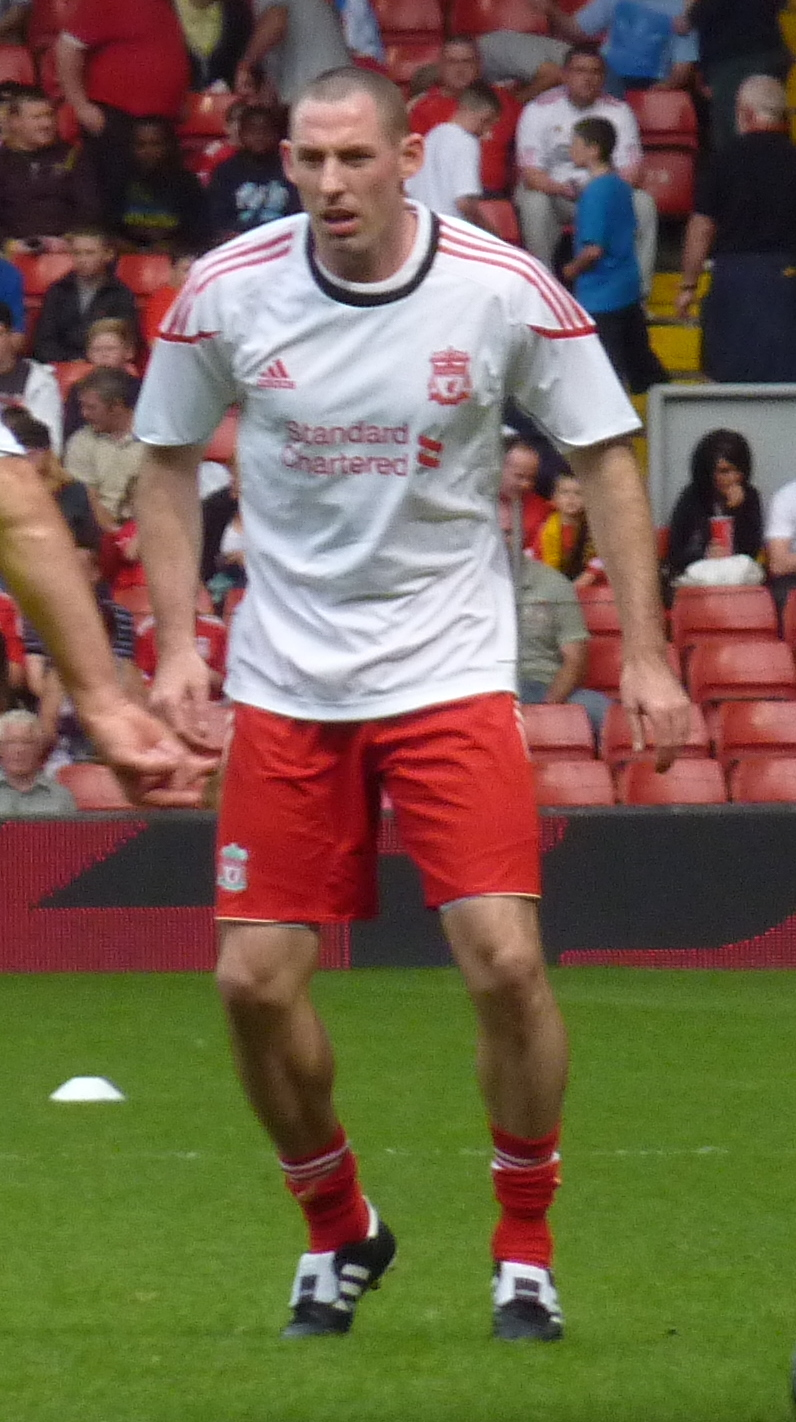
- Wright playing in Jamie Carragher's Testimonial in 2010

Personal information
- Full name: Stephen John Wright
- Date of birth: 8 February 1980 (age 46)
- Place of birth: Bootle, Liverpool, England
- Height: 6 ft 0 in (1.83 m)
- Position: Defender

Youth career
- 1996–1997: Liverpool

Senior career*
Years	Team	Apps	(Gls)
1997–2002	Liverpool	14	(0)
1999	→ Crewe Alexandra (loan)	5	(0)
1999–2000	→ Crewe Alexandra (loan)	17	(0)
2002–2008	Sunderland	91	(2)
2007–2008	→ Stoke City (loan)	16	(0)
2008–2010	Coventry City	55	(0)
2010–2011	Brentford	11	(0)
2011–2012	Hartlepool United	10	(0)
2012–2014	Wrexham	54	(2)
2014–2015	Aberystwyth Town	16	(0)
2015–2016	Rhyl	17	(1)
2016–2017	Denbigh Town		
Total		306	(5)

International career
1998–1999	England U18	5	(0)
1999	England U20	3	(0)
2000–2002	England U21	10	(0)
- * Club domestic league appearances and goals

Stephen John Wright (born 8 February 1980) is an English former professional footballer who works for Liverpool academy as a coach.

== Club career ==
=== Liverpool ===
Born in Bootle, Liverpool, Wright joined Liverpool on a youth contract in June 1996, choosing to join Liverpool over rivals Everton, the club he supported as a boy. Wright turned professional a year later in August 1997, and the following season was named as an unused substitute for the UEFA Cup clash with Celta Vigo on 24 November 1998 alongside Steven Gerrard.

Following two successful loan spells with Crewe Alexandra in the 1999–2000 season, Wright made his Liverpool debut in the 8–0 drubbing of Stoke City on 29 November 2000 in the League Cup, replacing Markus Babbel at half time. He went on to play four times that season for Liverpool, including a brief substitute appearance against future club Sunderland at the Stadium of Light in February 2001. He was also an unused substitute as Liverpool won the 2001 UEFA Cup final.

Initially starting out as a centre back, Wright made the transition to right back during the 2001–02 season, where he established himself as a useful member of the Liverpool squad. On 27 October 2001, Wright saw red for the first time in his career, after being sent off against Charlton Athletic at The Valley. Wright scored his first goal for the club three days later in the UEFA Champions League against Borussia Dortmund. The game ended 2–0 to Liverpool. Wright eventually went on to make 21 first team appearances for Liverpool, while scoring only the one goal.

=== Sunderland ===
After finding first team opportunities increasingly difficult to come by, Wright joined Sunderland in a £1.5 million deal, which would eventually rise to £3 million. Wright was handed the number 2 shirt and made first choice right back, replacing Bernt Haas, who had moved on loan to FC Basel. Wright's tough and uncompromising style made him initially popular with the Sunderland faithful, however, a drastic loss of form, combined with Sunderland's dreadful form in the league saw him criticised towards the end of the season. Sunderland were eventually relegated with a record low of 19 points, in a season that saw manager Peter Reid sacked just weeks after signing Wright, and his replacement, Howard Wilkinson, sacked five months into his role.

Wilkinson was replaced by former Republic of Ireland manager Mick McCarthy, who often alternated between Wright and teammate Darren Williams for the right back slot during the 2003–04 season. With the club performing well in the league, Wright's confidence grew as a player, and he soon won over his critics with a series of solid displays. Wright scored his first goal for the club on 25 August 2003 against Watford at the Stadium of Light.

Unfortunately for Wright, Sunderland were beaten in the play-offs by Crystal Palace, crushing any hope of a swift return to the Premier League. During the summer, McCarthy strengthened the squad by signing Manchester United right back Mark Lynch, though Wright remained first choice. After a poor start, Sunderland eventually won the league comfortably, with Wright playing a major role and earning himself the respect of the supporters that had once criticised him. As a measure of his popularity, Wright was one of the front-runners for the annual Player of the Year award, eventually finishing in 4th place.

With Sunderland returning to the Premier League, Wright was expected to resume his role at right back, however, a serious knee injury put Wright on the shelf for six months, just one game into the season. Upon returning to fitness, Wright was sent off for two bookable offences on his comeback game against West Ham United on 4 February 2006 and later picked up an ankle injury in training that required surgery. This effectively ended Wright's season after just two appearances, as Sunderland crashed out with another record low points tally.

With McCarthy dismissed towards the end of the 2005–06 season, new chairman and former teammate Niall Quinn agreed to take the reins, however, decided to leave Wright out of the opening games of the 2006–07 season, instead preferring midfielder Rory Delap for the role. Wright made his first appearance for seven months in the 3–2 defeat to Plymouth on 12 August 2006, however, picked up another injury in the defeat to Bury two games later, and battled with Nyron Nosworthy and on-loan defender Danny Simpson to regain his position after resuming training with the first team.

=== Stoke City ===
On 3 August 2007, it was announced that Wright had joined Stoke City on a five-month loan deal. However his time at Stoke was overshadowed by injuries and therefore made only 17 appearances before being sent back to Sunderland in January 2008.

=== Back to Sunderland ===
His loan spell with Stoke ended in January 2008. He returned to Sunderland in January hoping to get back in the starting XI but failed to do so. Wright was released by Sunderland at the end of the 2007–08 season.

=== Coventry City ===
Over the course of the summer of 2008, several clubs, including Hull City, expressed an interest in signing Wright. He spent pre-season training on trial with Coventry City, playing an active part in their pre-season fixtures. After an extended period of negotiations, Wright signed a two-year contract with Coventry on 8 August 2008, the day before the first game of the season. On 14 July 2009, Wright was appointed as Coventry captain by manager Chris Coleman. At the end of the 2009–10 Coventry City told Wright he was surplus to requirements and he was subsequently released.

=== Later career ===
Following his release from Coventry Wright joined Brentford on trial and appeared in a reserves match against Leyton Orient. He signed a contract on 29 October 2010.

In August 2011 he was training with Hartlepool United, and featured in a reserve team game away at Gateshead. He subsequently signed a short-term deal with Hartlepool, making his debut in a 2–0 victory over Exeter City. After playing eleven matches for Hartlepool, Wright left the club in January 2012.

On 2 March 2012, he signed a deal at Wrexham until the end of the season. His debut for the club came the following day against Kettering. He scored his first goal for Wrexham against Hereford United on 10 November 2012. On 24 March 2013, Wright picked up his third honour in football with the North Wales club by winning the FA Trophy at Wembley Stadium, they beat Grimsby Town 4–1 on penalties.

On 5 September 2014, Wright joined Welsh Premier League side Aberystwyth Town where he spent a season, before joining Rhyl. He dropped down to the Cymru Alliance in 2016 signing for Denbigh Town. Wright left the club in 2017 and officially retired from playing. He took up a coaching position at the Wrexham AFC Centre of Excellence before leaving in 2019 to join Liverpool in a coaching position with their academy set-up where he still remains.

== International career ==
He was capped for the England U-20 team at the 1999 FIFA World Youth Championship, with teammates Stuart Taylor, Ashley Cole, Peter Crouch, Andy Johnson, Matthew Etherington, etc. But the team finished bottom at the group stage, after three defeats.

== Personal life ==
Wright's father, John Wright, was a kitman at former club Liverpool.

In 2006, Wright became an investor in Golf Punk magazine, alongside former Sunderland teammates Phil Babb, Michael Gray, Jason McAteer, and Thomas Sørensen, saving the publication from closure.

== Career statistics ==
Appearances and goals by club, season and competition
Club	Season	League			FA Cup		League Cup		Europe		Other		Total	
Club	Season	Division	Apps	Goals	Apps	Goals	Apps	Goals	Apps	Goals	Apps	Goals	Apps	Goals
Liverpool	1998–99	Premier League	0	0	0	0	0	0	0	0	―		0	0
Liverpool	2000–01	Premier League	2	0	1	0	1	0	0	0	―		4	0
Liverpool	2001–02	Premier League	12	0	1	0	1	0	3 (Note: Appearances in UEFA Champions League)	1	0	0	17	1
Liverpool	Total		14	0	2	0	2	0	3	1	0	0	21	1
Crewe Alexandra (loan)	1999–2000	First Division	22	0	0	0	1	0	―		0	0	23	0
Sunderland	2002–03	Premier League	25	0	3	0	0	0	―		―		28	0
Sunderland	2003–04	First Division	22	1	5	0	1	0	―		0	0	28	1
Sunderland	2004–05	Championship	39	1	2	0	1	0	―		―		45	1
Sunderland	2005–06	Premier League	2	0	0	0	0	0	―		―		2	0
Sunderland	2006–07	Championship	3	0	0	0	1	0	―		―		4	0
Sunderland	Total		91	2	10	0	3	0	―		0	0	107	2
Stoke City (loan)	2007–08	Championship	16	0	0	0	1	0	―		―		17	0
Coventry City	2008–09	Championship	17	0	3	0	1	0	―		―		21	0
Coventry City	2009–10	Championship	38	0	2	0	1	0	―		―		41	0
Coventry City	Total		55	0	5	0	2	0	―		―		62	0
Brentford	2010–11	League One	11	0	2	0	―		―		0	0	13	0
Hartlepool United	2011–12	League One	10	0	1	0	0	0	―		0	0	11	0
Wrexham	2011–12	Conference National	12	0	―		―		―		―		12	0
Wrexham	2012–13	Conference National	25	1	1	0	―		―		1 (Note: Appearance in FA Trophy)	0	27	1
Wrexham	2013–14	Conference National	17	1	2	0	―		―		1	0	20	1
Wrexham	Total		54	2	3	0	―		―		2	0	59	2
Aberystwyth Town	2014–15	Welsh Premier League	16	0	1	0	0	0	0	0	―		17	
Rhyl	2015–16	Welsh Premier League	17	1	0	0	0	0	―		―		17	1
Career total			306	5	24	0	9	0	3	1	3	1	344	6

== Honours ==
Liverpool

- UEFA Cup: 2000–01

Sunderland

- Football League Championship: 2004–05

Wrexham

- FA Trophy: 2012–13
