= Phil Babb =

Footballer (born 1970)

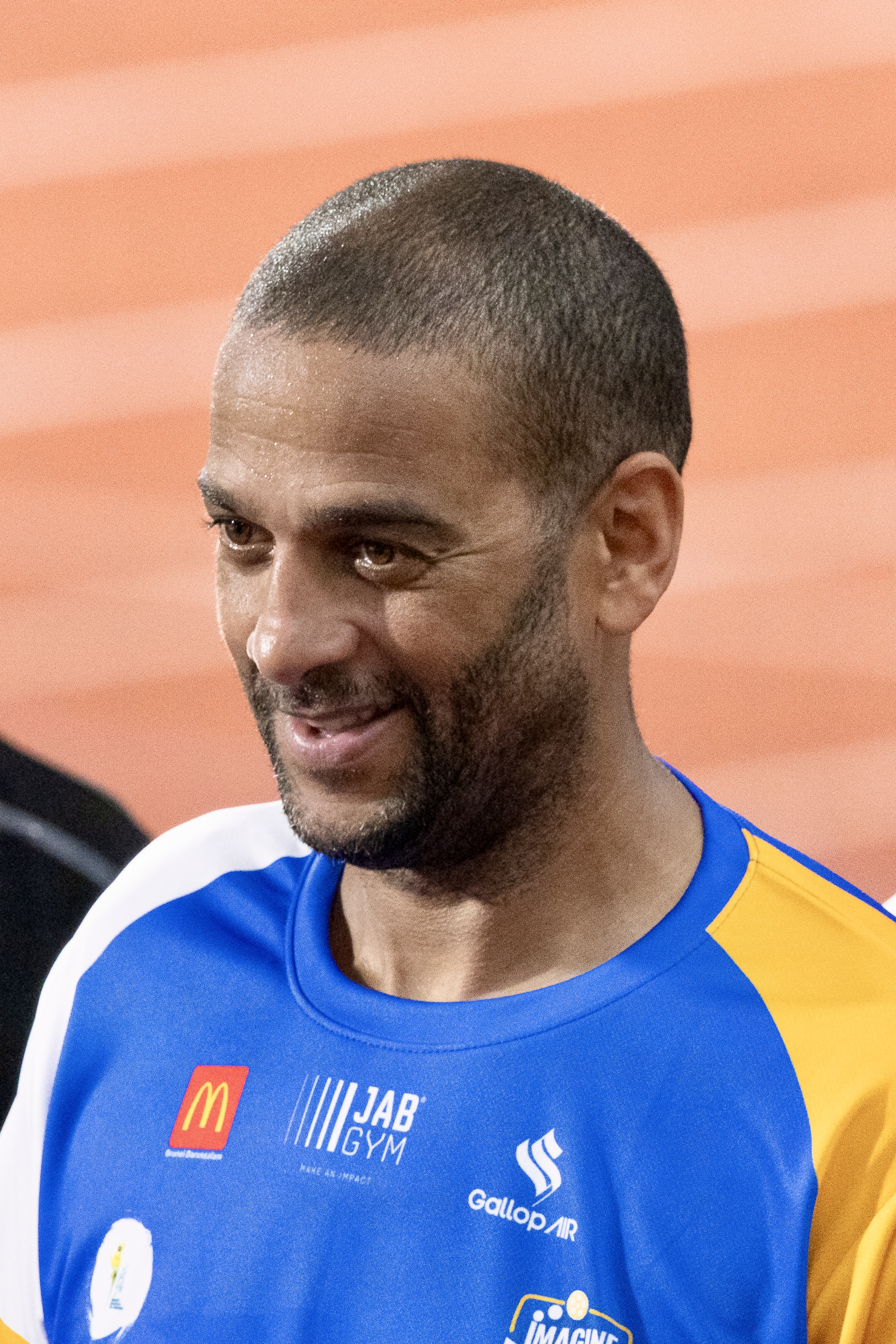
- Babb in 2024

Personal information
- Full name: Philip Andrew Babb
- Date of birth: 30 November 1970 (age 55)
- Place of birth: Lambeth, England
- Height: 1.83 m (6 ft 0 in)
- Position: Centre back

Youth career
- –1989: Millwall

Senior career*
| Years | Team | Apps | (Gls) |
| 1989–1992 | Bradford City | 80 | (14) |
| 1992–1994 | Coventry City | 77 | (3) |
| 1994–2000 | Liverpool | 128 | (1) |
| 2000 | → Tranmere Rovers (loan) | 4 | (0) |
| 2000–2002 | Sporting CP | 37 | (0) |
| 2002–2004 | Sunderland | 48 | (0) |
| Total | | 374 | (18) |

International career
| 1994–2002 | Republic of Ireland | 35 | (0) |

Managerial career
- 2013–2015: Hayes & Yeading United
- * Club domestic league appearances and goals

Philip Andrew Babb (born 30 November 1970) is a sports television pundit and former professional football player and manager.

As a player he was a central defender who made over 370 league appearances during his career, most notably spending six Premier League seasons with Liverpool, and also playing in the top flight for Coventry City and Sunderland. He also played in Portugal for Sporting CP and in the Football League for Bradford City and Tranmere Rovers. Babb represented the Republic of Ireland at the 1994 World Cup, playing in 35 internationals.

He later had a spell as manager of Non-league side Hayes & Yeading United, but has largely worked as a pundit for Sky Sports and other networks since retiring.

== Club career ==
Born in Lambeth, London, Babb came through the youth ranks of Millwall, before beginning his senior career in 1990 with Bradford City. He moved to Coventry City in July 1992 for a fee of £500,000, where he spent two seasons before moving to Liverpool on 1 September 1994 for £3.6 million, which made him the most expensive defender in Britain at the time.

Babb only scored once during six Premier League years and 170 appearances in all competitions for Liverpool, incidentally against his former club, Coventry, in September 1996. While at Liverpool he played in the victorious 1995 Football League Cup Final. In 1998, Babb was involved in an infamous blooper against Chelsea which ended with him sliding into the goalpost with a leg either side, injuring his coccyx. In January 2000 he joined Tranmere Rovers on a one-month loan and helped them reach the 2000 Football League Cup Final, however his loan spell ended before the final itself and he was unable to take part. He moved to Portugal with Sporting CP on a free transfer in 2000, appearing in 38 official games in his second season – one goal against FC Midtjylland in the UEFA Cup (3–0 away win, 6–2 on aggregate)– as the Lions conquered both the league and the domestic cup.

Babb ended his career at the age of 33 with Sunderland (also two years), suffering top level relegation in 2003, and helping the Black Cats to a Football League Championship play-off semi-final.

== International career ==
Babb was born in England to a Guyanese father and Irish mother. Having chosen to represent the Republic of Ireland internationally, Babb earned 35 full caps, including four matches at the 1994 FIFA World Cup. In August 2000, he and Ireland teammate Mark Kennedy were sent home from a training camp "after appearing in court charged with drunken and abusive behaviour and causing criminal damage."

Babb's final game for Ireland was in UEFA Euro 2004 qualifying against Russia in Moscow, on 7 September 2002: having come into the game in the 85th minute, his first touch of the ball was diverted behind Irish goalkeeper Shay Given for an own goal.

== Managerial career ==
On 9 May 2013, Babb was appointed as manager of Conference South side Hayes & Yeading United.

He left the club by mutual consent in February 2015.

== Personal life ==
In 2006, Babb became an investor in Golf Punk magazine, alongside former Sunderland teammates Michael Gray, Jason McAteer, Thomas Sørensen and Stephen Wright, saving the publication from closure. He also worked as a pundit for Sky Sports.

== Career statistics ==
=== Club ===
Appearances and goals by club, season and competition
| Club | Season | League | | | FA Cup | | League Cup | | Europe | | Total | |
| Club | Season | Division | Apps | Goals | Apps | Goals | Apps | Goals | Apps | Goals | Apps | Goals |
|---|---|---|---|---|---|---|---|---|---|---|---|---|
| Bradford City | 1990–91 | Third Division | 34 | 10 | | | | | – | | 34 | 10 |
| Bradford City | 1991–92 | Third Division | 46 | 4 | | | | | – | | 46 | 4 |
| Bradford City | Total | | 80 | 14 | 0 | 0 | 0 | 0 | 0 | 0 | 80 | 14 |
| Coventry City | 1992–93 | Premier League | 34 | 0 | | | | | | | 34 | 0 |
| Coventry City | 1993–94 | Premier League | 40 | 3 | | | | | | | 40 | 3 |
| Coventry City | 1994–95 | Premier League | 3 | 0 | | | | | | | 3 | 0 |
| Coventry City | Total | | 77 | 3 | 0 | 0 | 0 | 0 | 0 | 0 | 77 | 3 |
| Liverpool | 1994–95 | Premier League | 34 | 0 | 6 | 0 | 7 | 0 | – | | 47 | 0 |
| Liverpool | 1995–96 | Premier League | 28 | 0 | 4 | 0 | 4 | 0 | 4 | 0 | 40 | 0 |
| Liverpool | 1996–97 | Premier League | 22 | 1 | 1 | 0 | 3 | 0 | 5 | 0 | 31 | 1 |
| Liverpool | 1997–98 | Premier League | 19 | 0 | 0 | 0 | 2 | 0 | 1 | 0 | 22 | 0 |
| Liverpool | 1998–99 | Premier League | 25 | 0 | 1 | 0 | 0 | 0 | 4 | 0 | 30 | 0 |
| Liverpool | 1999–2000 | Premier League | 0 | 0 | 0 | 0 | 0 | 0 | – | | 0 | 0 |
| Liverpool | Total | | 128 | 1 | 12 | 0 | 16 | 0 | 14 | 0 | 170 | 1 |
| Tranmere Rovers | 1999–2000 | First Division | 4 | 0 | | | | | | | 4 | 0 |
| Sporting CP | 2000–01 | Primeira Liga | 10 | 0 | | | | | | | 10 | 0 |
| Sporting CP | 2001–02 | Primeira Liga | 27 | 0 | | | | | | | 27 | 0 |
| Sporting CP | Total | | 37 | 0 | 0 | 0 | 0 | 0 | 0 | 0 | 37 | 0 |
| Sunderland | 2002–03 | Premier League | 26 | 0 | | | | | | | 26 | 0 |
| Sunderland | 2003–04 | First Division | 22 | 0 | | | | | | | 22 | 0 |
| Sunderland | Total | | 48 | 0 | 0 | 0 | 0 | 0 | 0 | 0 | 48 | 0 |
| Career total | | | 374 | 18 | 12 | 0 | 16 | 0 | 14 | 0 | 416 | 18 |

=== International ===
Appearances and goals by national team and year
| National team | Year | Apps | Goals |
|---|---|---|---|
| Republic of Ireland | 1994 | 12 | 0 |
| Republic of Ireland | 1995 | 7 | 0 |
| Republic of Ireland | 1996 | 2 | 0 |
| Republic of Ireland | 1997 | 2 | 0 |
| Republic of Ireland | 1998 | 3 | 0 |
| Republic of Ireland | 1999 | 3 | 0 |
| Republic of Ireland | 2000 | 5 | 0 |
| Republic of Ireland | 2001 | 0 | 0 |
| Republic of Ireland | 2002 | 1 | 0 |
| Total | | 35 | 0 |

== Honours ==
Liverpool

- Football League Cup: 1994–95
- FA Cup runner-up: 1995–96

Sporting CP

- Supertaça Cândido de Oliveira: 2000
- Primeira Liga: 2001–02
- Taça de Portugal: 2001–02

== See also ==
- List of Republic of Ireland international footballers born outside the Republic of Ireland
