= Jason McAteer =

Irish-English footballer (born 1971)

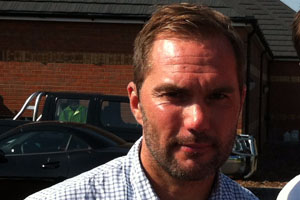
- McAteer in 2013

Personal information
- Full name: Jason Wynne McAteer
- Date of birth: 18 June 1971 (age 55)
- Place of birth: Birkenhead, Cheshire, England
- Position: Midfielder

Youth career
- 1990–1992: Marine

Senior career*
Years	Team	Apps	(Gls)
1992–1995	Bolton Wanderers	114	(8)
1995–1999	Liverpool	100	(3)
1999–2001	Blackburn Rovers	72	(4)
2001–2004	Sunderland	53	(5)
2004–2007	Tranmere Rovers	81	(4)
Total		420	(24)

International career
1994	Republic of Ireland B	1	(0)
1994–2004	Republic of Ireland	52	(3)

Managerial career
- 2009: Tranmere Rovers (assistant)
- * Club domestic league appearances and goals

Jason Wynne McAteer (born 18 June 1971) is a former professional footballer. His primary position was in midfield either in the centre or on the right flank, though he was also an able full-back. Born in England, he represented the Republic of Ireland national team at international level, winning 52 international caps and playing at two World Cups in 1994 and 2002.

During his professional career from 1992 to 2007, McAteer played for five clubs: Bolton Wanderers, Liverpool, Blackburn Rovers, Sunderland and finally Tranmere Rovers. His transfer fees added up to £9.5 million.

== Club career ==
=== Bolton Wanderers ===
McAteer was born in Birkenhead, Cheshire (now Merseyside). His family were shaken by the closure of the shipyards in the 1980s, and he began the 1990s in a state of unemployment. McAteer got his big break aged 20, at local non-league team Marine, when impressing for Marine Reserves against the Bolton Wanderers A team in 1992. He had no contract with Marine, and Bolton purchased the young midfielder for £500 plus a large bag of footballs. He made his first-team debut against Burnley in a Division Two game at Burnden Park on 28 November 1992, finishing on the winning side in a 4–0 triumph. He made a total of 21 appearances in the 1992–93 season for Bolton, who finished the season as runners-up and secured promotion to Division One. Bolton were FA Cup quarter-finalists in the 1993–94 season and achieved a comfortable position in Division One. During the 1994–95 season, Bolton reached the final of the Football League Cup (their first appearance in a major cup final for 37 years), but lost 2–1 to Liverpool.

McAteer and his colleagues returned to Wembley the following month on 29 May 1995, as they reached the final of the Division One playoffs having finished third in the league. Their opponents on this occasion were Reading. Reading took a 2–0 lead in the first half and led the match until the 86th minute when Bolton scored a late equaliser to make the game 2–2 and force extra-time. Bolton went on to win the match 4–3 after extra time, and McAteer was given his first chance of FA Premier League football.

=== Liverpool ===
Early in the 1995–96 season, McAteer joined Liverpool in a £4.5 million deal after he played against them in the 1995 Football League Cup final for Bolton. He came close to joining Blackburn Rovers in 1995, but when Liverpool declared an interest, McAteer decided to sign for the team he had supported as a boy and turned down the then Blackburn manager Kenny Dalglish. He made his Liverpool debut on 16 September 1995 in a 3–0 win against Blackburn at Anfield, coming on as a late substitute for John Barnes.

During his time at Anfield, McAteer also filled in at right back for certain spells despite being primarily a central midfielder. He broke his leg whilst playing against Blackburn at Anfield on 31 January 1998. He made a full recovery and on his return to the first team scored two goals against West Ham United on 2 May 1998. He played in the 1996 FA Cup final against Manchester United in which Liverpool lost to a single goal scored by Eric Cantona. In total he made 139 appearances for Liverpool, scoring six goals over four seasons.

McAteer was part of the group of 1990s Liverpool players known as the "Spice Boys" for the tabloid attention towards their private lives. Other players named in this group included Robbie Fowler, Steve McManaman and Jamie Redknapp.

=== Blackburn Rovers ===
Blackburn Rovers manager Brian Kidd signed McAteer for £4 million on 27 January 1999. He signed a four-year contract with wages of £20,000 a week. Rovers were relegated that season, but McAteer would help the club to promotion back to the Premiership in 2001 during his second full season with the club. During his time with Rovers, McAteer had a vicious argument one day with manager Graeme Souness, and said of him in 2002: "He almost ruined my career and I cannot help but despise him for it."

=== Sunderland ===
Souness sold McAteer to Sunderland for £1 million in October 2001, on a three-year deal. He made 27 appearances that season, but was unable to prevent the Black Cats' relegation to the First Division the following season. After a double abdominal hernia operation, he played only five times between September 2002 and December 2003. In his first game back, on 13 December, he took just four minutes to score away to West Ham United, albeit in a 3–2 loss. He played both legs of the play-off semi-final against Crystal Palace in May 2004 before being released at the end of the year.

=== Tranmere Rovers ===
In July 2004, McAteer was close to a one-year deal at newly relegated Leicester City, which was called off due to unforeseen circumstances. Days later, he signed a two-year deal with Tranmere Rovers, hoping to play out his career with his hometown club. He trained as a coach ready to embark on a career in that department after his retirement. He was made club captain by manager Brian Little, skippering the side to the League One play-off semi-finals, where they eventually lost on penalties to Hartlepool United.

He was released by Tranmere Rovers in May 2007 and announced his retirement shortly afterwards. On 15 June 2009, he was appointed assistant manager to former Liverpool teammate John Barnes at Tranmere. On 9 October, the pair were sacked after a run of just two league wins from 11 games.

== International career ==
McAteer was deemed eligible to qualify to play for Republic of Ireland through a grandfather who was born in County Down. In February 2024, he said that before playing for the Republic of Ireland, he had never been there, nor was he sure he was of Irish origin. Believing that his Irish ancestor was a great-grandfather, he was instructed by the Football Association of Ireland to choose a random McAteer from County Down of an appropriate age to be his claimed grandfather, in order to achieve an Irish passport.

Before pledging his international career to the Republic of Ireland, McAteer had been tracked for the England B team alongside his Bolton teammate Alan Stubbs. He reflected in 2024 that choosing the Republic of Ireland was the better decision, as Stubbs was never capped for England at senior level. McAteer also had a Welsh grandmother who asked him to play for their national team.

McAteer was capped 52 times between 1994 and 2004 making his debut on 23 March 1994 in a 0–0 draw against Russia in a friendly match at Lansdowne Road and was selected by manager Jack Charlton for the Republic's 1994 World Cup squad. McAteer came on as a substitute in the Republic's 1–0 group stage victory over Italy on 18 June.

McAteer played in his second World Cup in 2002. He scored a goal for the Irish in a 2–2 draw against Netherlands in Amsterdam on 2 September 2000 qualifying and the winner in a 1–0 win against them on 1 September 2001. These two results ultimately contributed to the Republic qualifying for the Finals in second place in the Group with 24 points, while Netherlands, in third place on 20 points, missed out. At the tournament itself he played 45 minutes of Republic of Ireland's opening match versus Cameroon and then 11 minutes as a substitute in their third match with Saudi Arabia.

McAteer was critical of Roy Keane after the Saipan Incident at the 2002 World Cup, saying, "Everything is black or white with Roy, there is no such colour as grey. I do not always understand his rage." McAteer said that when they clashed during Sunderland's match against Manchester United in August 2002, he had said to Keane: "Put it all in your next book". Keane responded by elbowing McAteer on the side of the head.

== Personal life ==
McAteer was nicknamed "Trigger", after an Only Fools and Horses character of low intelligence. He said in 2005 that he cultivated this image in order to play more matches, as managers would be comfortable putting him in different positions. Anecdotes spread about McAteer's purported low intelligence, including that he had asked for a pizza to be cut into four pieces and not eight because he was not hungry; he confirmed in 2005 that this story is true.

McAteer released an autobiography, Blood, Sweat & Jason McAteer, in 2017. In it, he said that he struggled with depression and thoughts of suicide after his football career ended.

McAteer married his first wife, Kristina Delaney, at Slane Castle in 2001. In October 2013, he married Lucy Edwards in Limerick with the reception at Dromoland Castle. McAteer said that while he was at the 2022 UEFA Champions League final with LFC TV, his wife and 22-year-old son were assaulted and robbed amidst the chaos.

=== Endorsements ===
McAteer featured in EA Sports' FIFA video game series; he was on the cover for the International edition of FIFA Soccer 96, alongside Frank de Boer.

In 1997, McAteer featured in a Wash & Go shampoo advert, for which he was reportedly paid £100,000.

== Post-playing career ==
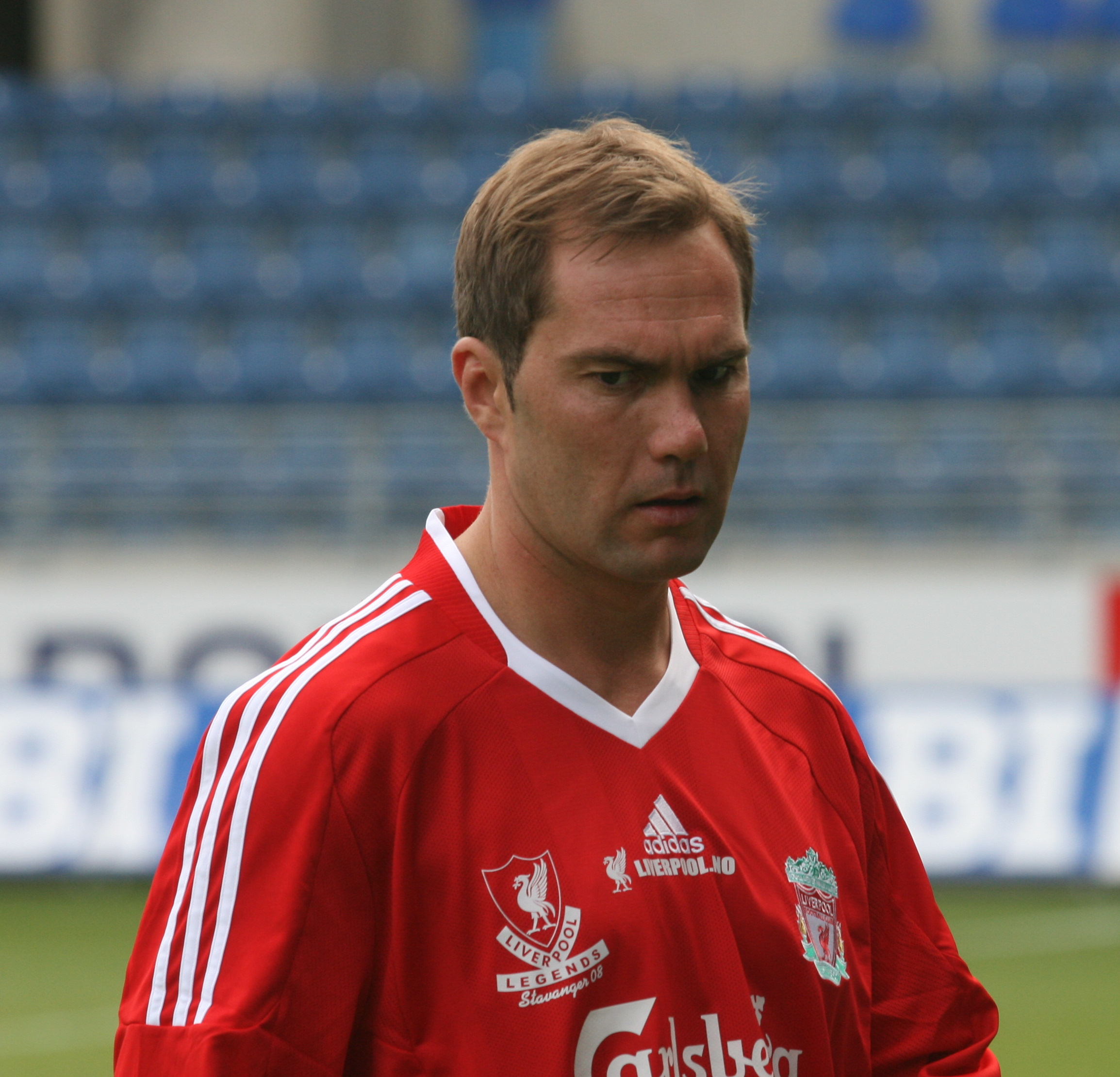
McAteer at a Liverpool Legends game in July 2008

McAteer has regularly appeared for the Liverpool legends who play in various charity games around the world. In March 2005, he recruited friends from football and showbusiness for Tsunami Soccer Aid which generated over half a million pounds for Save the Children, helping survivors of the 2004 Indian Ocean earthquake and tsunami. In May 2008, he visited Banda Aceh in Indonesia to see how the money had been used.

In 2006, McAteer became an investor in Golf Punk magazine, alongside former Sunderland teammates Phil Babb, Michael Gray, Thomas Sørensen and Stephen Wright, saving the publication from closure.

In April 2011, while participating in a charity football match between Darndale F.C. and Liverpool/Manchester United Legends in aid of Autism Ireland, McAteer clashed with Dublin GAA goalkeeper Stephen Cluxton. Cluxton punched McAteer and knocked him to the ground. Cluxton and McAteer were both sent off.

McAteer regularly appears as a pundit on beIN Sports. He has worked in the media for Asia-based ESPN Star Sports. He has also worked on LFC TV.

== Honours ==
Bolton Wanderers

- Football League First Division play-offs: 1995
- Football League Cup runner-up: 1994–95

Liverpool

- FA Cup runner-up: 1995–96

Individual

- PFA Team of the Year: 1993–94 First Division, 1994–95 First Division

== See also ==
- List of Republic of Ireland international footballers born outside the Republic of Ireland
