= Jonjo Dickman =

English footballer

Personal information
- Full name: Jonjo Dickman
- Date of birth: 22 September 1981 (age 45)
- Place of birth: Hexham, England
- Height: 5 ft 8 in (1.73 m)
- Position: Midfielder

Youth career
- –1998: Sunderland

Senior career*
Years	Team	Apps	(Gls)
1998–2005	Sunderland	1	(0)
2004	→ York City (loan)	2	(0)
2005–2006	Darlington	46	(3)
Total		49	(3)
- * Club domestic league appearances and goals

Jonjo Dickman (born 22 September 1981) is an English former professional footballer who played as a midfielder.

== Career ==
Dickman was born in Hexham, Northumberland. He started his career at Sunderland, signing a professional contract in November 1998 after progressing through the club's youth system. He made one first-team appearance, as a half-time substitute in a 3–0 away defeat to Manchester City on 21 April 2003.
