= Sean Thornton =

Irish association football player (born 1983)

Personal information
- Full name: Sean Thornton
- Date of birth: 18 May 1983 (age 43)
- Place of birth: Drogheda, Ireland
- Height: 1.78 m (5 ft 10 in)
- Position: Midfielder

Senior career*
Years	Team	Apps	(Gls)
2001–2002	Tranmere Rovers	11	(1)
2002–2005	Sunderland	49	(9)
2002	→ Blackpool (loan)	3	(0)
2005–2007	Doncaster Rovers	59	(2)
2007–2010	Leyton Orient	91	(12)
2008	→ Shrewsbury Town (loan)	5	(1)
2011–2013	Aberystwyth Town	24	(8)
2013	Conwy Borough	6	(3)
2014	Bala Town	11	(0)
2015–2017	Drogheda United	67	(11)
2017–2018	Rathmullen Celtic		
2018–2019	Athboy Celtic		
2019	Newfoundwell		
2019–2020	Moneymore		

International career
2000	Republic of Ireland U16	8	(2)
2000	Republic of Ireland U18	3	(0)
2001–2002	Republic of Ireland U19	9	(1)
2003–2005	Republic of Ireland U21	12	(0)
- * Club domestic league appearances and goals

Sean Thornton (born 18 May 1983) is an Irish former professional footballer. He made 11 appearances in the Premier League for Sunderland in the 2002–03 season and has made over 200 appearances in the Football League, mostly for Sunderland, Doncaster Rovers and Leyton Orient.

== Club career ==
=== Tranmere Rovers ===
Thornton began his career with Football League Second Division club Tranmere Rovers in 2001, for whom he made 13 appearances in the 2001–02 season, scoring once against Wigan Athletic. He was out of contract in summer 2002 and joined Premier League side Sunderland in July 2002, for a fee of £225,000 agreed at tribunal, amid allegations by Tranmere that Sunderland had breached FA and Football League regulations by making an illegal approach for Thornton, for which Sunderland were later fined £1,500.

=== Sunderland ===
Thornton did not feature in the Sunderland first team at the beginning of the 2002–03 season and joined Blackpool on a one-month loan in November 2002. He made his debut for Sunderland in a FA Cup third-round replay win over Bolton Wanderers in January 2003, impressing manager Howard Wilkinson who said, "That was the first full game I've seen Sean in and I must say it was a very promising and mature performance. He's certainly a player we want to keep an eye on and bring on but it's now up to him to show he can produce that standard consistently." He made 14 appearances for Sunderland in the 2002–03 season, despite missing part of the season after being called up for the Ireland Under-20 squad for the World Youth Championships in the United Arab Emirates in March 2003. In April 2003, he scored with an impressive volley to give Sunderland an early lead against Chelsea although Sunderland went on to lose the match. He was unable to help Sunderland from being relegated at the end of the season. All 11 of his Premier League appearances that season ended in defeat, giving him the record for worst season that was broken 13 years later by Aston Villa's Jack Grealish.

Thornton made 13 appearances for Sunderland at the start of the 2003–04 season, before suffering an ankle injury in a reserve team game in October 2003. He returned to the side in January 2004 and made a further 17 appearances, helping Sunderland to the semifinal of the FA Cup, and the Division One playoff semifinal. Thornton was unable to command a regular first team place at the start of the 2004–05 season and by September 2004, was seeking a move away from the club. A transfer did not materialise and with his first team chances limited, he made only 20 appearances for Sunderland in the 2004–05 season. At the end of the season, he was transfer listed.

=== Doncaster Rovers ===
Following Sunderland's promotion to the Premier League in May 2005, Thornton was sold to Football League One club Doncaster Rovers in July 2005 for a club record fee of £175,000. He made 36 appearances for Doncaster in the 2005–06 season, missing several weeks owing to an ankle injury suffered in September 2005 that needed surgery. He helped Doncaster reach the quarterfinals of the Football League Cup, putting in a fine performance and scoring the third goal when Doncaster beat Premier League club, Aston Villa 3–0 in November 2005. Manager Dave Penney praised Thornton, saying: "It was a great goal for Sean and he's looking much brighter and sharper these days, and long may that continue." After the game, Thornton said that he felt had made the right move in the summer, saying "It was a gamble for me. I still had two years left on my contract at Sunderland. It was one of them – would I go, would I not go? Obviously we're playing good football and I think I made the right decision. Now, hopefully, we can carry on the success until the end of the season and get promoted. That's the main thing." In the 2006–07 season, Thornton made 41 appearances, and helped Doncaster to victory over Bristol Rovers in the Football League Trophy final in April 2007 when he swung in a corner kick for Graeme Lee to head in to score the extra time winner at the Millennium Stadium, Cardiff.

=== Leyton Orient ===
Thornton was released by Doncaster manager, Sean O'Driscoll at the end of the 2006–07 season, and joined another League One side, Leyton Orient in July 2007 on a two-year contract. Orient manager Martin Ling said that he was "... pleased to have Sean on board. We've been looking for a creative midfielder and Sean fits the bill perfectly. He will fit into our style of play and I believe we have signed a quality player." He scored on his debut against Southend United in August 2007, with a spectacular free kick from 30 yards in a 2–1 away win, and went on to make 34 appearances in the 2007–08 season, although he missed four matches after being sent off in October 2007 for allegedly punching another player. The following season, he joined Shrewsbury Town in September 2008 on a one-month loan, where he scored once against Darlington. On his return to Orient, he regained his place in the first team under new manager Geraint Williams and made a total of 34 appearances for Orient in the 2008–09 season in addition to his loan spell at Shrewsbury Town. He signed a new one-year contract with Orient in June 2009, with the option of a further year, but was released by Williams' replacement Russell Slade on 9 May 2010 after putting on too much weight.

Sean Thornton became something of a cult hero at Orient, leading to local folk-punk artist Steve White recording and releasing a song in praise of Thornton.

=== Aberystwyth Town ===
After false reports that he had signed for FC Metalist Kharkiv, Thornton signed for Aberystwyth Town on a short-term contract on 13 September 2011, in a move that was described by the club as 'arguably the biggest signing in Welsh Premier League history'. The midfielder scored his first goal in Aber colours on 11 November 2011, as the Seasiders hammered Port Talbot Town 4–0 at the Genquip Stadium. On 16 November 2011, it was announced that Thornton had agreed to extend his stay with Aberystwyth Town until the end of the 2011/12 Welsh Premier League campaign. He scored his second goal for the club in the 1–1 draw with Afan Lido. He was signed for another season (2012–13) at Aberystwyth Town.

=== Bala Town ===
On 3 January 2014, Thornton agreed to join Welsh Premier League side Bala Town. He was handed the number nine shirt.

=== Drogheda United ===
On 4 January 2015 Sean agreed to sign for hometown club Drogheda United in what would be his first experience of playing in the League of Ireland. Thornton signed along with former Athlone Town player Sean Brennan. Thornton made his debut against Bray Wanderers in a 1–0 away win. In his next game Thornton set up the winner with a free kick in a 3–2 win against Sligo Rovers.

On 26 November Thornton re-signed with the club on a year deal.

=== Rathmullen Celtic FC ===
Upon seeing his contract out with Drogheda United Thornton was recruited by newly-formed Non League side Rathmullen Celtic who play in Division 3 of the NEFL. Under the guidance of Chairman Robbie McDonnell and manager Stewie Barnett Thornton masterminded promotion to Div 2 for Rathmullen after reproducing arguably some of the best form of his career. Scoring 28 goals and assisting 14 in an advanced midfield role . However Thornton never got to play Division 2 football with Rathmullen after a pre season of upheaval seen the club go into administration before the new season began.

=== Athboy Celtic ===
With Rathmullen folding Thornton became a free agent. He received an offer from Athboy Celtic. The Meath club were playing in Division 1. With Thornton they finished outside the automatic promotion places and remained in division 1.

=== Newfoundwell FC ===
After one season at Athboy which resulted in a failed promotion attempt, Thornton followed manager Derek Kavanagh to the premier league of the NEFL and to 2017 treble winners Newfoundwell FC. The stay at the Well was short, as after failing to field a team in 2 separate matches the club were disqualified from the league and effectively disbanded in May 2019.

=== Moneymore FC ===
Thornton again found himself as a free agent and with the transfer window opening on 1 June 2019 he had the opportunity to sign for any NEFL club. Thornton opted to sign for Moneymore in the NEFL Div 3.

== International career ==
Thornton represented the Republic of Ireland Under-16 team at the 2000 UEFA European Under-16 Football Championship and the Under-19 team at the 2002 UEFA European Under-19 Football Championship.

== Personal life ==
Thornton's younger brother, Kevin, was also a professional footballer.

== Career statistics ==
(to end of 2008–09 season)

Club	Seasons	League; Apps (goals)	FA Cup; Apps (goals)	League Cup; Apps (goals)	Other; Apps (goals)	Total; Apps (goals)
Tranmere Rovers	2001–02	11 (1)	1 (0)	0 (0)	1 (0)	13 (1)
Sunderland	2002–03	11 (1)	3 (0)	0 (0)	0 (0)	14 (1)
Blackpool (loan)	2002	3 (1)	0 (0)	0 (0)	1 (0)	4 (1)
Sunderland	2003–04	22 (4)	4 (0)	2 (0)	2 (0)	30 (4)
Sunderland	2004–05	16 (4)	2 (0)	2 (0)	0 (0)	20 (4)
Doncaster Rovers	2005–06	29 (2)	3 (0)	3 (1)	1 (0)	36 (3)
Doncaster Rovers	2006–07	30 (0)	3 (0)	2 (0)	6 (1)	41 (1)
Leyton Orient	2007–08	31 (3)	1 (0)	1 (0)	1 (0)	34 (3)
Shrewsbury Town (loan)	2008	5 (1)	0 (0)	0 (0)	1 (0)	6 (1)
Leyton Orient	2008–09	30 (2)	3 (0)	1 (0)	0 (0)	34 (2)
Drogheda United	2015	2(0)	0 (0)	0 (0)	0 (0)	2 (0)

== Honours ==
Sunderland

- Football League Championship: 2004–05

Doncaster Rovers

- Football League Trophy: 2006–07
