= Neil Teggart =

Northern Irish footballer

Personal information
- Full name: Neil Teggart
- Date of birth: 16 September 1984 (age 42)
- Place of birth: Downpatrick, Northern Ireland
- Position: Forward

Youth career
- Ardglass

Senior career*
Years	Team	Apps	(Gls)
2001–2004	Sunderland	0	(0)
2003–2004	→ Darlington (loan)	15	(0)
2005	→ Scunthorpe United (loan)	1	(0)
2005–2006	Perth Glory FC	0	(0)
2006	Livingston	20	(4)
2007	Hamilton Academical	2	(0)
2007	Kilmore		
2008–2009	Ballymena United	23	(9)
2009–2010	Portadown		
2010–2011	Newry City		
2011	Kilmore		

International career^{‡}
2004	Northern Ireland under-21	2	(0)
- * Club domestic league appearances and goals as of October 2008 ‡ National team caps and goals as of October 2008

Neil Teggart (born 16 September 1984 in Downpatrick) is a Northern Irish footballer. He was a Northern Ireland under-21 international, picking up two caps.

== Career ==
He had been a very promising prospect, coming through the youth system at Sunderland, but after loan spells at Darlington and Scunthorpe United, he was released without breaking into the first team squad. After an unsuccessful spell at Perth Glory FC in Australia, he went to Scotland, where he played for Livingston and Hamilton Academical.

Teggart was to sign for Portadown in 2008, but after an administrative error cost them their Premiership status he opted to join Ballymena United, where he scored nine goals. He eventually signed a three-year deal with Portadown on 10 May 2009, following the club's promotion back to the Premiership.

On 11 July, Teggart scored his first goal for Portadown on his debut, in a friendly against Warrenpoint Town. He made his competitive league debut on 15 August, in the 2–1 home defeat against Glentoran.

== Personal life ==
Teggart was arrested for assault in 2010.
