= Michael Gray (footballer) =

English footballer

Micky Gray
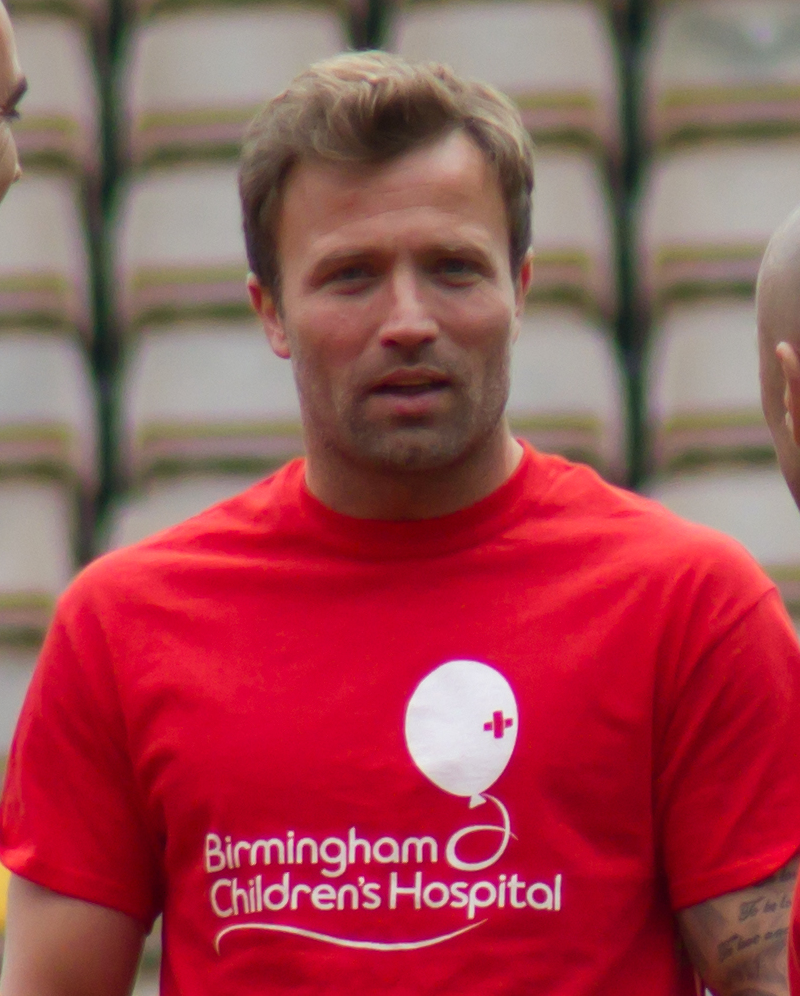
- Gray in 2014

Personal information
- Full name: Michael Gray
- Date of birth: 3 August 1974 (age 52)
- Place of birth: Sunderland, England
- Positions: Left-back; left winger

Youth career
- 1988–1990: Manchester United
- 1990–1992: Sunderland

Senior career*
Years	Team	Apps	(Gls)
1992–2004	Sunderland	363	(16)
2003	→ Celtic (loan)	7	(0)
2004–2007	Blackburn Rovers	64	(0)
2005	→ Leeds United (loan)	10	(0)
2007	→ Leeds United (loan)	6	(0)
2007–2009	Wolverhampton Wanderers	41	(4)
2009	→ Sheffield Wednesday (loan)	4	(0)
2009–2010	Sheffield Wednesday	39	(2)
Total		534	(22)

International career
1999	England	3	(0)
- * Club domestic league appearances and goals

Michael Gray (born 3 August 1974) is an English former professional footballer who played as a left-back or left winger for 18 years. He played for his hometown club Sunderland for 12 years, making 363 league appearances between 1992 and 2004 and including a brief loan spell with Celtic. In 2004, he moved to Blackburn Rovers and later had spells with Leeds United, Wolverhampton Wanderers and Sheffield Wednesday. In 1999, Gray earned three caps for England.

== Club career ==
=== Sunderland ===
While at school, Gray had trials with Manchester United and signed schoolboy forms, but decided against signing a contract at Old Trafford and continued playing for Fatfield Juniors F.C. in the Hetton Youth League. After 18 months he signed, as an apprentice, with Sunderland. He broke into the Sunderland first team shortly after his 18th birthday, at the beginning of the 1992–93 season. He made his senior debut on 21 November 1992 in a 1–0 win at Derby County in Division One (the first season after the creation of the new Premier League).

He played in various positions, including as a striker, left winger and left back before fading slightly from first team affairs. It was not until 1995–96 that he came to the fore, starting every game for Sunderland, invariably on the left side of midfield, as the team won promotion to the Premier League as Division One champions. Gray was also the scorer of their first Premier League goal, scoring the seventh-minute opener in a 4–1 win over Nottingham Forest at the City Ground on 21 August 1996.

Gray continued to be a regular in the side in 1996–97, but the club was relegated after just one year in the top flight. Gray gained unwanted attention a year later, in May 1998, when he missed the decisive penalty during a shoot-out in the First Division playoff final after a 4–4 draw with Charlton Athletic, which could have taken Sunderland back into the Premier League.

Sunderland finished first in Division One the following season and won promotion to the Premiership, with Gray an ever-present for the campaign. As a First Division player, he was picked by Kevin Keegan to make his international debut for England as a substitute in the match against Hungary on 28 April 1999. In June 1999, he also played for England against Sweden and started the match against Bulgaria. He was the last outfield player from outside of the English top-flight to appear for England until David Nugent in 2007 (goalkeeper David James played for England in 2003 whilst playing for West Ham in the First Division).

However, he failed to make the England squad for Euro 2000. This did not affect his domestic team's form, however, as they finished in seventh place in the Premiership, a feat repeated in 2000–01.

In the 2001–02 season, Sunderland struggled, and with their dip in form came a dip in form for Gray, and for the next two seasons, he was constantly rumoured to be moving elsewhere including to arch-rivals Newcastle United. Relegation came for Sunderland at the end of the 2002–03 season, and two games into the 2003–04 season Gray finally left, joining Celtic on 1 September 2003, on a four-month loan. However, having failed to make an impact, and generally finding himself out of the team, he moved to Blackburn Rovers on a free transfer on 1 January 2004.

Following Sunderland's relegation from the Premier League in 2003, Gray was fined two weeks' wages and stripped of the captaincy by Mick McCarthy after Gray turned up to training in a new Ferrari. McCarthy viewed Gray's actions as insensitive due to the fact a number of club staff could potentially be made redundant following relegation.

=== Celtic ===
Gray had a loan spell in 2003 where he appeared 7 times in the green and white of Celtic.

=== Blackburn Rovers ===
Gray made his Blackburn Rovers debut against Chelsea in a 3–2 defeat, but constantly performed well for the team as they avoided relegation. In February 2005, he joined Leeds United on loan until the season's end. He then returned to Blackburn and in his first season back there he helped them qualify for the UEFA Cup, having established himself as a first-team regular. He later rejoined Leeds United for a second loan spell in a bid to save them from relegation, which ultimately failed as the club plunged into the third tier in 2007.

=== Wolverhampton Wanderers ===
Wolverhampton Wanderers completed the signing of Gray on an initial 12-month contract in July 2007, reuniting him with his former Sunderland manager Mick McCarthy. After spending the early part of the season in his more traditional left-back role, he was switched to left midfield in February 2008, which immediately saw him score his first goal in almost six years, and led to a run of three goals in five games. He signed a further one-year deal to keep him at the club for the 2008–09 season, but featured only sporadically for the first team during a campaign that would end in promotion for them.

=== Sheffield Wednesday ===
Largely out of Wolves' first team plans, he joined fellow Championship side Sheffield Wednesday on a 30-day emergency loan on 9 January 2009. This was made into a permanent deal on 2 February 2009, when he signed a contract until the end of the season. On the same day, he was also voted Wednesday's player of the month for January. He scored his first goal for Wednesday in a 2–2 draw with Barnsley on 8 August 2009.

The 2009–10 season ended with relegation to League One after the club could only draw 2–2 in their final fixture with relegation rivals Crystal Palace. Three days later it was announced he would not be offered a new contract, which led to him announcing his playing retirement.

== International career ==
Gray earned his first cap for England on 28 April 1999, coming on as a 74th minute substitute in the 1–1 friendly draw with Hungary at the Népstadion in Budapest. He made his competitive debut on 5 June, coming on for Graeme Le Saux at half-time in the 0–0 draw with Sweden during Euro 2000 qualifying. On 9 June, Gray made his first start for England in the 1–1 draw with Bulgaria, this was also during Euro 2000 qualifying. This turned out to be Gray's last cap for his country. He won a total of three caps for England, scoring no goals.

== Personal life ==
Gray was involved in a fracas with Wayne Rooney in 2006 following a disagreement at the Panacea Bar and Restaurant in Manchester and was later ejected from the restaurant.

In 2006, Gray became an investor in Golf Punk magazine, alongside former Sunderland teammates Phil Babb, Jason McAteer, Thomas Sørensen and Stephen Wright, saving the publication from closure.

His nephew, Jordan Richards, is a professional footballer who plays for Southport.

Gray has written a blog for the BBC. He also is a pundit for Talksport and is the station's Manchester correspondent.

On 11 September 2016, Gray took part in the Great North Run.

== Honours ==
Sunderland

- Football League First Division: 1995–96, 1998–99

Individual

- PFA Team of the Year: 1995–96 First Division, 1998–99 First Division

Preceded by Steve Bould	Sunderland captain 2000–2003	Succeeded by Jason McAteer
