= Chris Brown (footballer, born 1984) =

English footballer (born 1984)

Personal information
- Full name: Christopher Alan Brown
- Date of birth: 11 December 1984 (age 41)
- Place of birth: Doncaster, England
- Height: 6 ft 1 in (1.85 m)
- Position: Forward

Youth career
- –2003: Sunderland

Senior career*
Years	Team	Apps	(Gls)
2003–2007	Sunderland	66	(9)
2003–2004	→ Doncaster Rovers (loan)	22	(10)
2005	→ Hull City (loan)	13	(1)
2007–2008	Norwich City	18	(1)
2008–2011	Preston North End	107	(18)
2011–2014	Doncaster Rovers	87	(19)
2014–2016	Blackburn Rovers	37	(0)
2016–2017	Bury	0	(0)
Total		350	(58)
- * Club domestic league appearances and goals

Christopher Alan Brown (born 11 December 1984) is an English former professional footballer who played as a forward.

Brown came through the youth academy at Sunderland, where he signed professional terms in 2003 before going on to feature in the Premier League. He also played in the Football League for Doncaster Rovers, Hull City, Preston North End, Blackburn Rovers and Bury.

== Career ==
=== Sunderland ===
Born in Doncaster, South Yorkshire, Brown was a prolific goalscorer at school and youth level. Brown rose through the youth ranks at the team he supported as a boy, Sunderland, making his debut for the under-19 team at the age of just 15. However, Brown suffered a setback in 2002 when he damaged his cruciate ligament whilst playing for the reserve side, forcing him to miss the entire 2002–03 season. During this season Sunderland were relegated from the Premier League.

After making a successful recovery, Brown was promoted to the Sunderland first team, and was allocated the number 31 shirt for the club's first season back in the First Division. During the season, Brown was loaned to Doncaster Rovers, where he made 22 appearances during his seven-month stay, scoring 10 goals. Brown ended the season with a Third Division medal.

Brown was handed the number 20 squad number at Sunderland for the 2004–05 season, with many tipping Brown to break through into the first team that season as the club bounced back from a play-off defeat to Crystal Palace the year below. Brown was named as an unused substitute for the trip to Plymouth on 21 August and officially Brown made his debut for Sunderland on 21 September, scoring twice in the 3–3 draw with Crewe Alexandra in the League Cup. Although Sunderland lost the game on penalties, Brown impressed enough to retain his place for the trip to Leeds United four days later, with the game resulting in a 1–0 victory for Sunderland.

Brown featured throughout the season for Sunderland, making 14 starts and 23 substitute appearances, scoring 7 goals. Although mainly being used as a substitute during the first half of the season, Brown enjoyed an extended run in the side towards the end of the campaign, as Sunderland clinched the newly renamed Championship title and won promotion. At the end of the season, Brown was beaten by teammate Stephen Elliott for the club's "young player of the year" award.

Brown featured for Sunderland during the pre-season tour of US and Canada, though was told by manager Mick McCarthy that he needed to gain further first team experience on loan at another club. Brown made a second-half substitute appearance against Liverpool at Anfield on 20 August and later joined Championship side Hull City on loan on 8 September until January. Brown struggled during his time at the KC Stadium however, scoring once against Reading in 13 appearances, and was recalled by Sunderland in November. After three appearances back at Sunderland however, Brown picked up an injury which would sideline him until March, by which time Sunderland looked destined for relegation after a disaster of a season.

=== Norwich City ===
Brown completed a £325,000 move to Norwich on 11 January 2007, signing a two-and-a-half-year contract. Upon signing he was allocated the number 14 shirt previously worn by Leon McKenzie. He was sent off for a second bookable offence on his first start for Norwich.

He made his debut as a substitute in the 3–1 league defeat against Plymouth and made his full debut against Blackpool in the FA Cup 4th round although he was sent off in the 2nd half. Shortly after his suspension he suffered a hamstring injury which disrupted the start of his Norwich career.

On 23 October 2007, in his 20th appearance for the club in all competitions, Brown opened his Norwich City account with a goal against Burnley in a 2–1 defeat.

=== Preston North End ===
On 10 January 2008, Brown completed a £400,000 move to Preston North End. Brown made his debut against Watford and received the man of the match award after an impressive performance.

=== Doncaster Rovers ===
On 7 July 2011, Brown joined Doncaster Rovers on a free transfer after his contract with Preston North End ended.

=== Blackburn Rovers ===
On 23 June 2014, Brown signed a two-year deal with Blackburn Rovers. In mid-September, it was reported Chris was going for surgery on his knee and will return within 6 weeks. Brown received a red card after just 10 minutes in a 2–1 Rovers victory away to Newport on 18 January.

Brown was the subject of derision from Rovers fans for failing to score a single goal for the club.

Brown was released by Blackburn Rovers in the summer of 2016.

=== Bury ===
Brown joined League One side Bury in August 2016, signing a one-year contract with an option for a further year. He did not feature at any level for the first-team due to recovery from knee surgery.

== Personal life ==
Brown is a boyhood Sunderland fan who grew up in Peterlee and attended The Academy at Shotton Hall. He is the son of former Sunderland, Newcastle United, Shrewsbury Town and Doncaster striker Alan Brown.

Since February 2019, Brown has co-hosted the podcast Undr the Cosh with his former Preston North End teammate Jon Parkin and comedy writer Chris J. Brown. The show has received over one million downloads and has raised money for various charities, including £1,200 raised for Prostate Cancer UK following a 145-mile bike ride in June 2019.

== Controversies ==
=== Paintball shooting ===
On 7 September 2004, shortly before Brown's debut for Sunderland, Brown was cautioned by Northumbria Police along with teammates Sean Taylor and Ryan Bell for firing paintballs at passers-by from a car. The trio were initially suspended by the club during investigations, and were fined and handed written warnings for their behaviour. During a statement, the trio said they were "embarrassed" by their behaviour, and apologised for their actions. Brown made his debut the same day his fine was announced on 21 September 2004 and remained a first-team regular until his departure from the club.

=== Sex tape scandal ===
On 7 December 2006, it was reported that Brown, along with teammates Ben Alnwick and Liam Lawrence had filmed themselves in an orgy with a brunette girl referred to as 'Stevie'. In the video, Brown films his teammates perform sexual acts on the girl as well as themselves, and is said to give "Match of the Day" style commentary throughout. Former Sunderland midfielder Martin Woods also features on the tape partially clothed, along with two other men. In reference to the watching men, Brown reportedly comments "Here's the boys — the watching faithful — every week without fail."

== Career statistics ==
Appearances and goals by club, season and competition
Club	Season	League			FA Cup		League Cup		Other		Total	
Club	Season	Division	Apps	Goals	Apps	Goals	Apps	Goals	Apps	Goals	Apps	Goals
Sunderland	2004–05	Championship	37	5	2	0	1	2	—		40	7
Sunderland	2005–06	Premier League	13	1	0	0	0	0	—		13	1
Sunderland	2006–07	Championship	16	3	0	0	0	0	—		16	3
Sunderland	Total		66	9	2	0	1	2	—		69	11
Doncaster Rovers (loan)	2003–04	Third Division	22	10	0	0	0	0	—		22	10
Hull City (loan)	2005–06	Championship	13	1	0	0	0	0	—		13	1
Norwich City	2006–07	Championship	4	0	3	0	—		—		7	0
Norwich City	2007–08	Championship	14	1	—		3	0	—		17	1
Norwich City	Total		18	1	3	0	3	0	—		24	1
Preston North End	2007–08	Championship	17	5	2	0	—		—		19	5
Preston North End	2008–09	Championship	30	6	0	0	0	0	2 (Note: Appearances in Football League play-offs)	0	32	6
Preston North End	2009–10	Championship	43	6	2	1	3	4	—		48	11
Preston North End	2010–11	Championship	16	1	1	0	3	0	—		20	1
Preston North End	Total		106	18	5	1	6	4	2	0	119	23
Doncaster Rovers	2011–12	Championship	11	2	0	0	1	1	—		12	3
Doncaster Rovers	2012–13	League One	36	8	2	1	2	1	2 (Note: Appearances in Football League Trophy)	1	42	11
Doncaster Rovers	2013–14	Championship	40	9	1	0	2	0	—		43	9
Doncaster Rovers	Total		87	19	3	1	5	2	2	1	97	23
Blackburn Rovers	2014–15	Championship	20	0	1	0	0	0	—		21	0
Blackburn Rovers	2015–16	Championship	17	0	2	0	1	0	—		20	0
Blackburn Rovers	Total		37	0	3	0	1	0	0	0	41	0
Bury	2016–17	League One	0	0	0	0	0	0	0	0	0	0
Career total			349	58	16	2	16	8	4	1	385	69

== Honours ==
Doncaster Rovers

- Football League Third Division: 2003–04
- Football League One: 2012–13

Sunderland

- Football League Championship: 2004–05, 2006–07

Individual

- Doncaster Rovers Player of the Year: 2013–14
