= 2004–05 Sunderland A.F.C. season =

English football club season

Sunderland
2004–05 season
- Manager: Mick McCarthy
- Stadium: Stadium of Light
- Championship: 1st (promoted)
- FA Cup: Fourth round
- League Cup: Second round
- Top goalscorer: League: Marcus Stewart (16); All: Marcus Stewart (17)
- Average home league attendance: 28,820

During the 2004–05 English football season, Sunderland A.F.C. competed in the Football League Championship.

== Season summary ==
While a poor start to the season saw Sunderland win just one of their first six matches, putting manager Mick McCarthy under pressure, the board kept faith with the manager, and were rewarded with a much more consistent season than the previous one. The team never dropped out of the top six after a victory over Millwall in mid-October, and their form steadily improved over the season. Along with a collapse by early-season pace-setters Ipswich Town, this lifted Sunderland to the top of the table with seven matches remaining, and they held onto top spot, returning to the Premier League after two seasons.

== Transfers ==
=== In ===
==== Summer ====
Date	Pos	Name	From	Fee
1 June 2004	FW	(Republic of Ireland) Stephen Elliott	Manchester City	Free
10 June 2004	MF	(Wales) Carl Robinson	Portsmouth	Free
21 June 2004	MF	(England) Dean Whitehead	Oxford United	Free
25 June 2004	MF	(Republic of Ireland) Liam Lawrence	Mansfield Town	Free
27 June 2004	DF	(Scotland) Steven Caldwell	Newcastle United	Free
15 July 2004	DF	(England) Mark Lynch	Manchester United	Free
13 August 2004	DF	(Scotland) Neill Collins	Dumbarton	£25,000
10 September 2004	MF	(England) Simon Johnson	Leeds United	Loan (September to November)
16 September 2004	MF	(England) Darren Carter	Birmingham City	Loan (September to December)
23 September 2004	FW	(England) Michael Bridges	Bolton Wanderers	Loan until the end of the season
11 October 2004	DF	(Wales) Danny Collins	Chester City	£140,000
23 November 2004	MF	(Scotland) Andy Welsh	Stockport County	£35,000
1 December 2004	FW	(England) Michael Bridges	Bolton Wanderers	Free

==== January ====
Date	Pos	Name	From	Fee
24 March 2005	FW	(England) Brian Deane	Leeds United	Free

=== Out ===
==== Summer ====
Date	Pos	Name	To	Fee
25 June 2004	MF	(England) Tommy Smith	Derby County	Free
18 June 2004	DF	(England) Simon Ramsden	Grimsby Town	Free
19 July 2004	MF	(Republic of Ireland) Jason McAteer (Note: McAteer was born in Tranmere, England, but also qualified to represent the Republic of Ireland internationally and made his international debut for the Republic of Ireland in March 1994.)	Tranmere Rovers	Free
20 July 2004	FW	(Republic of Ireland) Michael Reddy	Grimsby Town	Free
21 July 2004	FW	(Jamaica) Darren Byfield (Note: Byfield was born in Sutton Coldfield, England, but also qualified to represent Jamaica internationally and made his international debut for Jamaica in 2003.)	Gillingham	Free
27 July 2004	MF	(England) Paul Thirlwell	Sheffield United	Free
5 August 2004	DF	(Sweden) Joachim Bjorklund	Wolverhampton Wanderers	Free
31 August 2004	MF	(Argentina) Nicolás Medina	Real Murcia	Free
10 September 2004	MF	(Republic of Ireland) Thomas Butler	Dunfermline Athletic	Free
23 September 2004	DF	(England) Darren Williams	Cardiff City	Loan
22 October 2004	DF	(England) Ben Clark	Hartlepool United	Free
5 November 2004	MF	(Wales) John Oster	Leeds United	Loan
10 December 2004	DF	(England) Darren Williams	Cardiff City	Free

==== January ====
Date	Pos	Name	To	Fee
29 January 2005	MF	(Wales) John Oster	Burnley	Free

== Players ==
=== First-team squad ===
Squad at end of season

Note: Flags indicate national team as defined under FIFA eligibility rules; some limited exceptions apply. Players may hold more than one non-FIFA nationality.

No.	Pos.	Nation	Player
1	GK	EST	Mart Poom
2	DF	ENG	Stephen Wright
3	DF	NIR	George McCartney
4	MF	WAL	Carl Robinson
5	DF	IRL	Gary Breen (Note: Breen was born in Barnet, England, but also qualified to represent the Republic of Ireland internationally and made his international debut for the Republic of Ireland in May 1996.) (captain)
6	DF	SCO	Steven Caldwell (vice-captain)
7	MF	IRL	Liam Lawrence (Note: Lawrence was born in Retford, England, but also qualified to represent the Republic of Ireland internationally through his grandfather and would be called up by the Republic of Ireland in February 2006 before making his international debut in May 2009.)
8	MF	NIR	Jeff Whitley (Note: Whitley was born in Ndola, Zambia, but was raised in England and also qualified to represent Northern Ireland internationally through his father. He represented England at U-17 level and Northern Ireland at U-21 level before making his international debut for Northern Ireland in 1997.)
9	FW	SCO	Kevin Kyle
10	FW	ENG	Marcus Stewart
11	MF	SCO	Andy Welsh (Note: Welsh was born in Manchester, England, but also qualified to represent Scotland internationally and has represented them at U-19 level.)
12	FW	ENG	Brian Deane
13	GK	NIR	Michael Ingham (Note: Ingham was born in Preston, England, but also qualified to represent Northern Ireland internationally and represented them at U-18 and U-21 level before making his international debut for Northern Ireland in June 2005.)

No.	Pos.	Nation	Player
14	MF	ENG	Dean Whitehead
15	MF	IRL	Sean Thornton
17	DF	SCO	Neill Collins
19	FW	IRL	Stephen Elliott
20	FW	ENG	Chris Brown
21	MF	ENG	Matt Piper
22	DF	ENG	Mark Lynch
23	MF	ENG	Grant Leadbitter
30	GK	ENG	Ben Alnwick
33	MF	ARG	Julio Arca
38	FW	ENG	Michael Bridges
39	DF	WAL	Danny Collins (Note: Collins was born in Chester, England, and represented them at C level, but also qualified to represent Wales internationally and made his international debut for Wales in February 2005.)
41	GK	NOR	Thomas Myhre

=== Left club during season ===
Note: Flags indicate national team as defined under FIFA eligibility rules; some limited exceptions apply. Players may hold more than one non-FIFA nationality.

No.	Pos.	Nation	Player
11	MF	ENG	Simon Johnson (on loan from Leeds United)
12	MF	WAL	John Oster (Note: Oster was born in Boston, England, but also qualified to represent Wales internationally and represented them at U-18 and U-21 level before making his international debut for Wales in 1997.) (to Burnley)
16	DF	ENG	Darren Williams (to Cardiff City)
18	DF	ENG	Ben Clark (to Hartlepool United)

No.	Pos.	Nation	Player
24	FW	NIR	Neil Teggart (to Perth Glory)
26	MF	ENG	Jonjo Dickman (to Darlington)
32	GK	SCO	Euan McLean (to Dundee United)
32	MF	ENG	Darren Carter (on loan from Birmingham City)

=== Reserves ===
The following players did not appear for the first-team this season.

Note: Flags indicate national team as defined under FIFA eligibility rules; some limited exceptions apply. Players may hold more than one non-FIFA nationality.

No.	Pos.	Nation	Player
25	MF	IRL	Colin Healy
27	MF	IRL	Richie Ryan
28	DF	ENG	Ryan Dodds
29	MF	ENG	Lewis Dodds
31	MF	NIR	Chris Kingsberry
34	FW	ENG	Jack Wanless

No.	Pos.	Nation	Player
35	MF	IRL	Niall Flynn
36	MF	ENG	Sean Taylor
37	DF	ENG	Dan Smith
42	GK	NIR	Trevor Carson
39	MF	USA	Stuart Holden (Note: Holden was born in Aberdeen, Scotland, but was raised in the United States from the age of 10 and represented them at U-20 and U-23 level before making his international debut for the United States in July 2009.)

== Results ==
Sunderland's score comes first.

Win	Draw	Loss

=== League Cup ===
Round	Date	Opponent	Venue	Result	Attendance	Goalscorers
First round	24 August 2004	Chester City	Stadium of Light	3-0	11,450	Hessey (own goal), Kyle, Caldwell
Second round	21 September 2004	Crewe Alexandra	Alexandra Stadium	3-3 (lost 2–4 on pens)	3,804	Brown (2), Elliott

=== FA Cup ===
Round	Date	Opponent	Venue	Result	Attendance	Goalscorers
Third round	8 January 2005	Crystal Palace	Stadium of Light	2-1	17,536	Welsh, Stewart (pen)
Fourth round	29 January 2005	Everton	Goodison Park	0-3	33,186	

=== Championship ===
==== League table ====
Pos	Team	Pld	W	D	L	GF	GA	GD	Pts	Promotion, qualification or relegation
1	Sunderland (C, P)	46	29	7	10	76	41	+35	94	Promotion to the FA Premier League
2	Wigan Athletic (P)	46	25	12	9	79	35	+44	87	Promotion to the FA Premier League
3	Ipswich Town	46	24	13	9	85	56	+29	85	Qualification for Championship play-offs
4	Derby County	46	22	10	14	71	60	+11	76	Qualification for Championship play-offs
5	Preston North End	46	21	12	13	67	58	+9	75	Qualification for Championship play-offs

Updated to match(es) played on 9 December 2011. Source: Football League Tables
Rules for classification: 1) points; 2) goal difference; 3) number of goals scored.
(C) Champions; (P) Promoted

==== Results summary ====
Overall								Home						Away					
Pld	W	D	L	GF	GA	GD	Pts	W	D	L	GF	GA	GD	W	D	L	GF	GA	GD
46	29	7	10	76	41	+35	94	16	4	3	45	21	+24	13	3	7	31	20	+11

Last updated: 4 December 2018.
Source: 11v11

==== Results by matchday ====
Round	1	2	3	4	5	6	7	8	9	10	11	12	13	14	15	16	17	18	19	20	21	22	23	24	25	26	27	28	29	30	31	32	33	34	35	36	37	38	39	40	41	42	43	44	45	46
Ground	A	H	H	A	H	A	A	H	H	A	A	H	H	A	A	H	H	A	A	H	A	H	A	H	H	A	A	H	A	H	A	H	A	H	H	A	A	H	H	A	A	H	A	H	A	H
Result	L	W	D	L	D	L	W	W	W	W	L	D	W	D	W	W	W	L	W	W	W	L	W	W	L	W	L	D	W	W	D	W	L	W	W	W	W	W	W	W	W	L	D	W	W	W
Position	24	12	11	16	16	17	15	8	6	4	7	7	5	6	6	5	3	4	4	3	3	3	3	3	4	2	3	3	3	3	3	3	3	3	2	1	2	2	1	1	1	1	1	1	1	1

A = Away; H = Home; W = Win; D = Draw; L = Loss

Date	Opponent	Venue	Result	Attendance	Scorers
7 August 2004	Coventry City	Highfield Road	0-2	16,460	
10 August 2004	Crewe Alexandra	Stadium of Light	3–1	22,341	Robinson, Stewart, Elliott
14 August 2004	Queens Park Rangers	Stadium of Light	2–2	26,063	Stewart, Caldwell
21 August 2004	Plymouth Argyle	Home Park	1–2	16,874	Stewart
28 August 2004	Wigan Athletic	Stadium of Light	1–1	26,330	Elliott
31 August 2004	Reading	Madjeski Stadium	0–1	15,792	
11 September 2004	Gillingham	Priestfield Stadium	4–0	8,775	Stewart (3), Elliott
14 September 2004	Nottingham Forest	Stadium of Light	2–0	23,540	Arca, Wright
18 September 2004	Preston North End	Stadium of Light	3–1	24,264	Elliott (2), Carter
24 September 2004	Leeds United	Elland Road	1–0	28,926	Robinson
28 September 2004	Sheffield United	Bramall Lane	0–1	17,908	
2 October 2004	Derby County	Stadium of Light	0–0	29,881	
16 October 2004	Millwall	Stadium of Light	1–0	23,839	Muscat (own goal)
19 October 2004	Watford	Vicarage Road	1–1	13,198	Elliott
25 October 2004	Rotherham United	Millmoor	1–0	6,026	Whitehead
30 October 2004	Brighton & Hove Albion	Stadium of Light	2–0	25,532	Arca, Lawrence (pen)
2 November 2004	Wolverhampton Wanderers	Stadium of Light	3–1	23,925	Lawrence (2), Elliott
5 November 2004	Millwall	The Den	0–2	10,513	
13 November 2004	Leicester City	Walkers Stadium	1–0	25,897	Caldwell
21 November 2004	Ipswich Town	Stadium of Light	2–0	31,723	Elliott, Brown
27 November 2004	Stoke City	Britannia Stadium	1–0	16,980	Bridges
4 December 2004	West Ham United	Stadium of Light	0–2	29,510	
11 December 2004	Cardiff City	Ninian Park	2–0	12,528	Whitehead, Lawrence
18 December 2004	Burnley	Stadium of Light	2–1	27,102	Arca, Bridges
26 December 2004	Leeds United	Stadium of Light	2–3	43,253	Lawrence (pen), Arca
28 December 2004	Nottingham Forest	City Ground	2–1	27,457	Elliott, Stewart
1 January 2005	Preston North End	Deepdale	2–3	22,051	Elliott, Thornton
3 January 2005	Gillingham	Stadium of Light	1–1	27,147	Brown
16 January 2005	Derby County	Pride Park	2–0	22,995	Elliott, Whitehead
22 January 2005	Sheffield United	Stadium of Light	1–0	27,337	Stewart
4 February 2005	Wolverhampton Wanderers	Molineux	1–1	26,968	Elliott
12 February 2005	Watford	Stadium of Light	4–2	24,948	Stewart (3, 1 pen), Brown
19 February 2005	Brighton & Hove Albion	Withdean Stadium	1–2	6,647	Arca
22 February 2005	Rotherham United	Stadium of Light	4–1	22,267	Whitehead, Thornton (2), Breen
26 February 2005	Cardiff City	Stadium of Light	2–1	32,788	Breen, Stewart
4 March 2005	Burnley	Turf Moor	2–0	12,103	Lawrence, Stewart
12 March 2005	Crewe Alexandra	Alexandra Stadium	1–0	7,949	Elliott
15 March 2005	Plymouth Argyle	Stadium of Light	5–1	25,258	Whitehead, Arca, Stewart (pen), Caldwell, Thornton
19 March 2005	Coventry City	Stadium of Light	1–0	29,424	Brown
2 April 2005	Queens Park Rangers	Loftus Road	3–1	18,198	Welsh, Brown, Arca
5 April 2005	Wigan Athletic	JJB Stadium	1–0	20,745	Stewart
9 April 2005	Reading	Stadium of Light	1–2	34,237	Arca
17 April 2005	Ipswich Town	Portman Road	2–2	29,230	Elliott, Robinson
23 April 2005	Leicester City	Stadium of Light	2–1	34,815	Stewart, Caldwell
29 April 2005	West Ham United	Boleyn Ground	2–1	33,482	Arca, Elliott
8 May 2005	Stoke City	Stadium of Light	1–0	47,350	Robinson

== Topscorers ==
1. (England) Marcus Stewart - 17
2. (Republic of Ireland) Stephen Elliott - 16
3. (Argentina) Julio Arca - 9
4. (England) Chris Brown - 7
5. (Republic of Ireland) Liam Lawrence - 6
6. (England) Dean Whitehead - 5
7. (Wales) Carl Robinson, (Republic of Ireland) Sean Thornton and (Scotland) Steven Caldwell - 4
8. (England) Michael Bridges, (Scotland) Andy Welsh and (Republic of Ireland) Gary Breen - 2
9. (Scotland) Kevin Kyle, (England) Darren Carter and (England) Stephen Wright - 1
