= 2010–11 Preston North End F.C. season =

English football club season

Preston North End
2010–11 season
- Chairman: Maurice Lindsay
- Manager: Phil Brown
- Stadium: Deepdale
- Championship: 22nd (relegated)
- FA Cup: Third round (eliminated by Nottingham Forest)
- League Cup: Third round (eliminated by Wigan Athletic)
- Top goalscorer: League: All: Iain Hume (12)
- Highest home attendance: 18,417 v. Norwich City (18 September 2010)
- Lowest home attendance: 8,994 v. Barnsley (9 November 2010)
Home colours	Away colours

The 2010–11 season was Preston North End's 131st season and eleventh consecutive season in the second tier of English football, now known the Championship, in which they finished 22nd and were relegated to League One. Along with competing in the Championship, the club also participated in the FA Cup and EFL Cup, being eliminated in the third round of both competitions. The season covered the period from 1 July 2010 to 30 June 2011.

== Review and events ==
=== Monthly events ===
This is a list of the significant events to occur at the club during the 2010–11 season, presented in chronological order. This list does not include transfers, which are listed in the transfers section below, or match results, which are in the results section.

June:

July:

August:

April: Preston North End are relegated to League One after a 1–0 defeat to Cardiff City.

== Squad details ==
=== Players info ===
No.	Name	Nat.	Place of birth	Date of birth	Club apps.	Club goals	Int. caps	Int. goals	Previous club	Date joined	Fee
1	Andrew Lonergan	(England)	Preston	19 October 1983	179	1	–	–	N/A	1 August 2000	Trainee
2	Craig Morgan	(Wales)	St Asaph	16 June 1985	–	–	21	0	Peterborough United	6 July 2010	£400,000
3	Bongani Khumalo	(South Africa)	Manzini	6 January 1987	–	–	19	1	Tottenham Hotspur	24 March 2011	Loan
4	Sean St Ledger	(Republic of Ireland)	Birmingham	28 December 1984	154	9	12	1	Peterborough United	7 July 2006	£225,000
5	Wayne Brown	(England)	Barking	20 August 1977	–	–	–	–	Leicester City	6 July 2010	Free
6	Amine Linganzi	(Algeria)	Alger	16 November 1989	–	–	–	–	Blackburn Rovers	13 January 2011	Loan
7	Paul Coutts	(Scotland)	Aberdeen	22 July 1988	14	1	–	–	Peterborough United	1 February 2010	Free
8	Paul Hayes	(England)	Dagenham	20 September 1983	–	–	–	–	Scunthorpe United	10 May 2010	Free
9	Chris Brown	(England)	Durham	11 December 1984	91	17	–	–	Norwich City	10 January 2008	£400,000
10	Barry Nicholson	(Scotland)	Dumfries	24 August 1978	41	3	3	0	Aberdeen	30 June 2008	Free
11	Keith Treacy	(Republic of Ireland)	Dublin	13 September 1988	17	2	1	0	Blackburn Rovers	1 February 2010	Free
12	David Gray	(Scotland)	Edinburgh	4 May 1988	–	–	–	–	Manchester United	16 July 2010	Free
14	Danny Mayor	(England)	Leyland	18 October 1990	8	0	–	–	N/A	1 July 2008	Trainee
15	Adam Barton	(England)	Blackburn	7 January 1991	1	0	–	–	N/A	1 July 2008	Trainee
16	Iain Hume	(Canada)	Edinburgh	30 October 1983	–	–	29	2	Barnsley	31 December 2010	Undisclosed
17	Paul Parry	(Wales)	Chepstow	19 August 1980	17	2	12	1	Cardiff City	3 August 2009	£300,000
18	Nathan Ellington	(England)	Bradford	2 July 1981	–	–	–	–	Watford	13 January 2011	Loan
19	Billy Jones	(England)	Shrewsbury	24 March 1987	118	7	–	–	Crewe Alexandra	11 June 2007	£250,000
20	Darel Russell	(England)	Mile End	22 October 1980	–	–	–	–	Norwich City	4 August 2010	Free
21	Iain Turner	(Scotland)	Stirling	26 January 1984	–	–	–	–	Everton	9 February 2011	Loan
22	Wayne Henderson	(Republic of Ireland)	Dublin	16 September 1983	9	0	6	0	Brighton & Hove Albion	31 January 2007	£150,000
23	Leon Clarke	(England)	Wolverhampton	10 February 1985	–	–	–	–	Queens Park Rangers	28 January 2011	Loan
24	Ian Ashbee	(England)	Birmingham	6 September 1974	–	–	–	–	Hull City	31 January 2011	Free
25	Andreas Arestidou	(England)	Morecambe	6 December 1989	–	–	–	–	Shrewsbury Town	15 July 2010	Free
27	Eddie Johnson	(United States)	Bunnell	31 March 1984	–	–	42	12	Fulham	31 January 2011	Loan
29	Leon Cort	(England)	London	11 September 1979	–	–	–	–	Burnley	25 November 2010	Loan
30	Jamie Douglas	(Northern Ireland)	Unknown	4 July 1992	–	–	–	–	N/A	1 July 2010	Trainee
31	Dominic Collins	(England)	Preston	15 April 1991	1	–	–	–	N/A	2 May 2010	Trainee
32	Sam Hart	(Wales)	Unknown	29 November 1991	–	–	–	–	N/A	1 July 2010	Trainee
34	Richard Chaplow	(England)	Accrington	2 February 1985	68	8	–	–	West Bromwich Albion	9 January 2008	£800,000
36	Neil Dougan	(Northern Ireland)	Unknown	8 March 1992	–	–	–	–	N/A	1 June 2010	Trainee
37	Conor McLaughlin	(Northern Ireland)	Unknown	26 July 1991	–	–	–	–	N/A	1 June 2010	Trainee
39	George Miller	(England)	Unknown	25 November 1991	–	–	–	–	N/A	1 July 2010	Trainee
40	Neal Trotman	(England)	Levenshulme	11 March 1987	3	0	–	–	Oldham Athletic	30 January 2008	£500,000
42	Bailey Wright	(Australia)	Melbourne	28 July 1992	–	–	–	–	VIS	1 July 2010	Free
43	Doyle Middleton	(England)	Sefton	11 April 1994	–	–	–	–	N/A	1 June 2010	Trainee
45	Daniel Devine	(Northern Ireland)	Belfast	7 September 1992	–	–	–	–	N/A	1 June 2010	Trainee
46	Scott Leather	(England)	Manchester	30 September 1992	–	–	–	–	N/A	1 June 2010	Trainee

== Competitions ==
=== Championship ===
==== League table ====
Pos	Team	Pld	W	D	L	GF	GA	GD	Pts	Promotion, qualification or relegation
20	Crystal Palace	46	12	12	22	44	69	−25	48	
21	Doncaster Rovers	46	11	15	20	55	81	−26	48	
22	Preston North End (R)	46	10	12	24	54	79	−25	42	Relegation to Football League One
23	Sheffield United (R)	46	11	9	26	44	79	−35	42	Relegation to Football League One
24	Scunthorpe United (R)	46	12	6	28	43	87	−44	42	Relegation to Football League One

Updated to match(es) played on 7 May 2011. Source: The Football League
Rules for classification: 1) points; 2) goal difference; 3) number of goals scored.
(R) Relegated

==== Results summary ====
Overall								Home						Away					
Pld	W	D	L	GF	GA	GD	Pts	W	D	L	GF	GA	GD	W	D	L	GF	GA	GD
45	10	12	23	53	77	−24	42	7	4	12	27	36	−9	3	8	11	26	41	−15

Last updated: 12 May 2011.
Source: PNEFC Championship Results

==== Matches ====
7 Aug 2010	Preston North End	0–2	Doncaster Rovers	Deepdale
15:00			O'Connor 12'; Hayter 18'	Attendance: 12,190

14 Aug 2010	Swansea City	4–0	Preston North End	Liberty Stadium
15:00	Dobbie 23'; Pratley 40'; Dyer 43'; Cotterill pen 56'			Attendance: 14,010

21 Aug 2010	Preston North End	1–0	Portsmouth	Deepdale
15:00	Hayes 18'			Attendance: 9,666

28 Aug 2010	Sheffield United	1–0	Preston North End	Bramall Lane
15:00	Calvé 74'			Attendance: 19,692

11 Sep 2010	Burnley	4–3	Preston North End	Turf Moor
17:20	Iwelumo 9', 84', 88'; Rodriguez 90'		Barton 23'; Treacy 32'; Parkin 70'; Jones (red card) 78'	Attendance: 15,509

14 Sep 2010	Preston North End	1–2	Nottingham Forest	Deepdale
19:45	Parkin 42'		McGugan 68', 81'	Attendance: 9,779

18 Sep 2010	Preston North End	0–1	Norwich City	Deepdale
15:00			Holt 62'	Attendance: 18,417

25 Sep 2010	Coventry City	1–2	Preston North End	Ricoh Arena
15:00	Gunnarsson 61'		Jones 35'; Hume 45'	Attendance: 14,945

28 Sep 2010	Leeds United	4–6	Preston North End	Elland Road
19:45	Becchio 15'; Bruce 20'; Somma 27', 39'		Parkin 5', 40', 64'; Treacy 54'; Davidson 58' (pen.); Hume 79'	Attendance: 22,727

2 Oct 2010	Preston North End	1–1	Reading	Deepdale
15:00	Treacy 23'; Russell (red card) 78'		Karacan 55'	Attendance: 10,269

16 Oct 2010	Derby County	3–0	Preston North End	Pride Park Stadium
15:00	Moxey 21'; Bueno 32'; Savage 90' (pen.)		Treacy (red card) 90'	Attendance: 26,117

19 Oct 2010	Preston North End	2–3	Scunthorpe United	Deepdale
19:45	Morgan 58'; Jones 64'		Dagnall 4'; O'Connor 65'; Woolford 82'	Attendance: 11,179

23 Oct 2010	Preston North End	4–3	Crystal Palace	Deepdale
15:00	Parkin 13', 25'; Treacy 36'; Davidson 66' (pen.)		Garvan 20'; Dorman 69'; Vaughan 80' (pen.)	Attendance: 10,116

30 Oct 2010	Leicester City	1–0	Preston North End	Walkers Stadium
15:00	Gallagher 36'			Attendance: 21,212

6 Nov 2010	Bristol City	1–1	Preston North End	Ashton Gate
15:00	Jones 71' (o.g.)		Hume 2'	Attendance: 14,429

9 Nov 2010	Preston North End	1–2	Barnsley	Deepdale
19:45	Morgan 4'		Hammill 44'; O'Connor 89'	Attendance: 8,994

12 Nov 2010	Preston North End	0–2	Hull City	Deepdale
19:45			Garcia 20'; Barmby 72'	Attendance: 9,088

20 Nov 2010	Queens Park Rangers	3–1	Preston North End	Loftus Road
15:00	Hulse 4'; Taarabt 56', 84'		Connolly 88' (o.g.)	Attendance: 13,505

27 Nov 2010	Preston North End	0–0	Millwall	Deepdale
15:00				Attendance: 9,579

4 Dec 2010	Cardiff City	1–1	Preston North End	Cardiff City Stadium
15:00	Keogh 90'		Tonge 26'	Attendance: 21,151

11 Dec 2010	Preston North End	1–0	Ipswich Town	Deepdale
15:00	Hume 50'			Attendance: 9,419

28 Dec 2010	Preston North End	1–3	Middlesbrough	Deepdale
15:00	Jones 27'		Lita 30', 59'; Wheater 61'	Attendance: 11,946

1 Jan 2011	Preston North End	1–2	Derby County	Deepdale
15:00	Davidson 90' (pen.)		Porter 70', 84'	Attendance: 11,198

3 Jan 2011	Crystal Palace	1–0	Preston North End	Selhurst Park
15:00	Iversen 58'			Attendance: 14,061

15 Jan 2011	Preston North End	1–1	Leicester City	Deepdale
15:00	Hume 90'		Yakubu 60'	Attendance: 14,205

22 Jan 2011	Middlesbrough	1–1	Preston North End	Riverside Stadium
15:00	Bates 71'		Jones 88'	Attendance: 16,157

1 Feb 2011	Barnsley	2–0	Preston North End	Oakwell
19:45	O'Connor 22'; Haynes 90'			Attendance: 10,740

5 February 2011	Preston North End	0–4	Bristol City	Deepdale
15:00			Keogh 5'; Clarkson 56', 65'; Pitman 85'	Attendance: 11,784

12 February 2011	Hull City	1–0	Preston North End	KC Stadium
15:00	Gerrard 45'			Attendance: 21,586

15 February 2011	Watford	2–2	Preston North End	Vicarage Road
19:45	Whichelow 69'; Thompson 79'		St Ledger 1'; Clarke 37'	Attendance: 10,620

19 February 2011	Preston North End	1–1	Queens Park Rangers	Deepdale
15:00	Nicholson 64'		Helguson 37'	Attendance: 10,521

22 February 2011	Nottingham Forest	2–2	Preston North End	City Ground
19:45	Konchesky 54'; Cohen 90+2'		Nicholson 16'; Jones 90+6'	Attendance: 28,310

26 February 2011	Preston North End	1–2	Burnley	Deepdale
15:00	Nicholson 23'		Rodriguez 32'; Cork 84'	Attendance: 17,136

5 March 2011	Norwich City	1–1	Preston North End	Carrow Road
15:00	Holt 62'		Brown 60'	Attendance: 25,572

8 March 2011	Preston North End	1–2	Leeds United	Deepdale
19:45	Hume 63'		Kilkenny 29'; Paynter 57'	Attendance: 15,269

15 March 2011	Scunthorpe United	0–3	Preston North End	Glanford Park
19:45			Treacy 32'; Jones 37'; Hume 43'	Attendance: 4,190

19 March 2011	Preston North End	2–1	Coventry City	Deepdale
15:00	Hume 24'; Nathan Ellington 90+4'		Bell 71'	Attendance: 12,269

2 April 2011	Preston North End	2–1	Swansea City	Deepdale
15:00	Hume 3' (pen.), 83'		Williams 24'	Attendance: 11,791

5 April 2011	Reading	2–1	Preston North End	Madjeski Stadium
19:45	Kébé 21'; Robson-Kanu 82'		McCarthy 52' (o.g.)	Attendance: 14,844

9 April 2011	Portsmouth	1–1	Preston North End	Fratton Park
15:00	Halford 62'		Hume 32'	Attendance: 14,349

12 April 2011	Doncaster Rovers	1–1	Preston North End	Keepmoat Stadium
19:45	Stock 77'		Hayes 80'	Attendance: 9,456

16 April 2011	Preston North End	3–1	Sheffield United	Deepdale
15:00	Treacy 55'; Treacy 68'; Nathan Ellington 90'		Slew 72'	Attendance: 12,076

23 April 2011	Millwall	4–0	Preston North End	The Den
17:20	Purse 42'; McQuoid 44'; Marquis 54'; Henry 65' (pen.)			Attendance: 10,426

25 April 2011	Preston North End	0–1	Cardiff City	Deepdale
15:00			Whittingham 6'	Attendance: 12,818

30 April 2011	Ipswich Town	2–1	Preston North End	Portman Road
15:00	Scotland 10'; Norris		Coutts	Attendance: 18,431

7 May 2011	Preston North End	3–1	Watford	Deepdale
12:45	Nicholson 28'; Hume 56'; Proctor 88'		Weimann 13'	Attendance: 10,953

=== FA Cup ===
8 Jan 2011 Third round	Preston North End	1–2	Nottingham Forest	Deepdale
15:00	Carter 35'		Anderson 50'; Chambers 89'	Attendance: 9,636

=== League Cup ===
10 Aug 2010 First round	Stockport County	0–5	Preston North End	Edgeley Park
19:45			Davidson pen 45'; James 58'; Hayes 67', 73'; King 89'	Attendance: 3,724

24 Aug 2010 Second round	Bradford City	1–2 (a.e.t.)	Preston North End	Valley Parade
19:45	Speight 83'		Coutts 45'; Treacy 109'	Attendance: 4,221

22 Sep 2010 Third round	Wigan Athletic	2–1	Preston North End	DW Stadium
20:00	Gómez 87'; N'Zogbia 90'		Treacy 23'	Attendance: 6,987

== Season statistics ==
=== Starts and goals ===
No.	Pos	Nat	Player	Total		Championship		League Cup		FA Cup	
No.	Pos	Nat	Player	Apps	Goals	Apps	Goals	Apps	Goals	Apps	Goals
1	GK	(England) ENG	Andrew Lonergan	33	0	29	0	3	0	1	0
2	DF	(Wales) WAL	Craig Morgan	31	2	29	2	1	0	1	0
3	DF	(South Africa) RSA	Bongani Khumalo	4	0	4	0	0	0	0	0
4	MF	(Ireland) EIR	Sean St Ledger	34	1	31	1	2	0	1	0
5	MF	(England) ENG	Wayne Brown	14	0	13	0	1	0	0	0
6	MF	(Algeria) ALG	Amine Linganzi	1	0	1	0	0	0	0	0
7	MF	(Scotland) SCO	Paul Coutts	26	2	22	1	3	1	1	0
8	MF	(England) ENG	Paul Hayes	25	4	22	2	2	2	1	0
9	FW	(England) ENG	Chris Brown	18	1	14	1	3	0	1	0
10	FW	(Scotland) SCO	Barry Nicholson	21	4	20	4	0	0	1	0
11	MF	(England) ENG	Keith Treacy	39	7	36	5	2	2	1	0
12	DF	(Scotland) SCO	David Gray	25	0	22	0	3	0	0	0
14	MF	(England) ENG	Danny Mayor	25	0	21	0	3	0	1	0
15	DF	(Northern Ireland) NIR	Adam Barton	35	1	33	1	2	0	0	0
16	FW	(Canada) CAN	Iain Hume	29	12	29	12	0	0	0	0
17	DF	(Wales) WAL	Paul Parry	25	0	23	0	2	0	0	0
18	FW	(England) ENG	Nathan Ellington	16	1	16	1	0	0	0	0
19	MF	(England) ENG	Billy Jones	44	6	41	6	1	0	2	0
20	MF	(England) ENG	Darel Russell	27	0	24	0	1	0	2	0
21	GK	(England) ENG	Iain Turner	12	0	12	0	0	0	0	0
22	FW	(Ireland) EIR	Wayne Henderson	2	0	2	0	0	0	0	0
23	FW	(England) ENG	Leon Clarke	6	1	6	1	0	0	0	0
24	MF	(England) ENG	Ian Ashbee	17	0	17	0	0	0	0	0
25	GK	(England) ENG	Andreas Arestidou	0	0	0	0	0	0	0	0
27	FW	(United States) USA	Eddie Johnson	14	0	14	0	0	0	0	0
29	DF	(England) ENG	Leon Cort	13	0	13	0	0	0	0	0
30	FW	(Northern Ireland) NIR	Jamie Douglas	3	0	2	0	0	0	1	0
31	DF	(England) ENG	Dominic Collins	0	0	0	0	0	0	0	0
32	DF	(Wales) WAL	Sam Hart	0	0	0	0	0	0	0	0
36	MF	(Northern Ireland) NIR	Neil Dougan	0	0	0	0	0	0	0	0
37	DF	(Northern Ireland) NIR	Conor McLaughlin	8	0	7	0	0	0	1	0
38	FW	(England) ENG	Jamie Proctor	5	1	5	1	0	0	0	0
39	DF	(England) ENG	George Miller	1	0	1	0	0	0	0	0
31	FW	(England) ENG	Neal Trotman	0	0	0	0	0	0	0	0
41	MF	(England) ENG	Darren Carter	15	0	14	0	0	0	1	0
42	FW	(Australia) AUS	Bailey Wright	2	0	1	0	0	0	1	0
43	MF	(England) ENG	Doyle Middleton	3	0	2	0	1	0	0	0
45	DF	(England) ENG	Daniel Devine	2	0	2	0	0	0	0	0
46	DF	(England) ENG	Scott Leather	2	0	2	0	0	0	0	0
	MF	(England) ENG	Richard Chaplow	19	5	17	4	2	1	0	0
	DF	(Scotland) SCO	Callum Davidson	20	4	18	3	2	1	0	0
	DF	(Jamaica) JAM	Ricardo Gardner	4	0	4	0	0	0	0	0
	DF	(England) ENG	Matty James	12	1	10	0	2	1	0	0
	MF	(Norway) NOR	Joshua King	9	1	7	0	2	1	0	0
	MF	(England) ENG	Jon Parkin	20	7	19	7	1	0	0	0

Notes: Player substitutions are not included.

=== Goalscorers ===
No.	Flag	Pos	Name	Championship	League Cup	FA Cup	Total
16	(Canada)	FW	Iain Hume	11	0	0	12
	(England)	FW	Jon Parkin	7	0	0	7
11	(Republic of Ireland)	MF	Keith Treacy	5	2	0	7
19	(England)	MF	Billy Jones	6	0	0	6
	(England)	MF	Richard Chaplow	4	0	0	4'
	(Scotland)	DF	Callum Davidson	3	1	0	4
8	(England)	FW	Paul Hayes	2	2	0	4
10	(England)	MF	Barry Nicholson	3	0	0	4
7	(England)	MF	Paul Coutts	1	1	0	2
2	(Wales)	DF	Craig Morgan	2	0	0	2
15	(England)	MF	Adam Barton	1	0	0	1
9	(England)	FW	Chris Brown	1	0	0	1
41	(England)	MF	Darren Carter	0	0	1	1
23	(England)	FW	Leon Clarke	1	0	0	1
18	(England)	FW	Nathan Ellington	1	0	0	1
	(England)	MF	Matty James	0	1	0	1
	(Norway)	MF	Joshua King	0	1	0	1
38	(England)	FW	Jamie Proctor	1	0	0	1
4	(Republic of Ireland)	DF	Sean St Ledger	1	0	0	1

=== Yellow cards ===
No.	Flag	Pos	Name	Championship	League Cup	FA Cup	Total
11	(Republic of Ireland)	MF	Keith Treacy	8	1	0	(yellow card) 9
19	(England)	DF	Billy Jones	8	0	0	(yellow card) 8
12	(Scotland)	DF	David Gray	5	2	0	(yellow card) 7
16	(Canada)	FW	Iain Hume	6	0	0	(yellow card) 6
26	(England)	FW	Jon Parkin	6	0	0	(yellow card) 6
20	(England)	MF	Darel Russell	5	0	1	(yellow card) 6
	(England)	MF	Richard Chaplow	5	0	0	(yellow card) 5
	(Scotland)	DF	Callum Davidson	4	0	0	(yellow card) 4
4	(Republic of Ireland)	DF	Sean St Ledger	4	0	0	(yellow card) 4
24	(England)	MF	Ian Ashbee	3	0	0	(yellow card) 3
7	(England)	MF	Paul Coutts	3	0	0	(yellow card) 3
14	(England)	MF	Danny Mayor	2	0	1	(yellow card) 3
17	(Wales)	MF	Paul Parry	2	0	1	(yellow card) 3
9	(England)	FW	Chris Brown	2	0	0	(yellow card) 2
5	(England)	DF	Wayne Brown	2	0	0	(yellow card) 2
	(Norway)	FW	Joshua King	1	1	0	(yellow card) 2
37	(Northern Ireland)	FW	Conor McLaughlin	2	0	0	(yellow card) 2
41	(England)	MF	Darren Carter	1	0	0	(yellow card) 1
8	(England)	FW	Paul Hayes	1	0	0	(yellow card) 1
1	(England)	GK	Andrew Lonergan	1	0	0	(yellow card) 1
2	(Wales)	DF	Craig Morgan	1	0	0	(yellow card) 1
10	(England)	MF	Barry Nicholson	1	0	0	(yellow card) 1
20	(England)	MF	Darel Russell	1	0	0	(yellow card) 1
42	(Australia)	DF	Bailey Wright	0	0	1	(yellow card) 1

=== Red cards ===
No.	Flag	Pos	Name	Championship	League Cup	FA Cup	Total
19	(England)	MF	Billy Jones	1	0	0	(red card) 1
20	(England)	MF	Darel Russell	1	0	0	(red card) 1
11	(Republic of Ireland)	MF	Keith Treacy	1	0	0	(red card) 1

=== Penalties awarded ===
Date	Success?	Penalty Taker	Opponent	Competition
2010-08-10	✓	(Scotland) Callum Davidson	Stockport County	League Cup
2010-08-10	✓	(England) Paul Hayes	Stockport County	League Cup
2010-09-28	✓	(Scotland) Callum Davidson	Leeds United	Championship
2010-10-23	✓	(Scotland) Callum Davidson	Crystal Palace	Championship
2011-01-01	✓	(Scotland) Callum Davidson	Derby County	Championship

=== End-of-season awards ===
Player of The Season Award	Billy Jones
Young Player of The Season Award	Conor McLaughlin
Player' Player of The Season Award	Iain Hume
Top Scorer Award	Iain Hume
Goal of The Season Award	Keith Treacy
Community Player of The Season Award	Billy Jones

=== Overall ===
Games played	50 (46 Championship, 3 League Cup, 1 FA Cup)
Games won	12 (10 Championship, 2 League Cup, 0 FA Cup)
Games drawn	12 (12 Championship, 0 League Cup, 0 FA Cup)
Games lost	26 (24 Championship, 1 League Cup, 1 FA Cup)
Goals scored	63 (54 Championship, 8 League Cup, 1 FA Cup)
Goals conceded	84 (79 Championship, 3 League Cup, 2 FA Cup)
Goal difference	−21
Yellow cards	82 (74 Championship, 7 League Cup, 1 FA Cup)
Red cards	3 (3 Championship, 0 League Cup, 0 FA Cup)
Worst discipline	(Republic of Ireland) Keith Treacy (9 (yellow card) , 1 (red card) )
Best result	5–0 (A) v Stockport County – League Cup – 2010.08.10
Worst result	4–0 (A) v Swansea City – Championship – 2010.08.14
Most appearances	(England) Billy Jones 42 (39 Championship, 2 League Cup, 1 FA Cup
Top scorer	(Canada) Iain Hume (12 goals)
Points	42 / 132 (31.81%)

== Transfers ==
=== Transfers in ===
Player	From	Date	Fee
(England) Wayne Brown	Leicester City	6 July 2010	Undisclosed
(Wales) Craig Morgan	Peterborough United	6 July 2010	Undisclosed
(England) Paul Hayes	Scunthorpe United	15 July 2010	Free
(Scotland) David Gray	Manchester United	16 July 2010	Undisclosed
(England) Andreas Arestidou	Shrewsbury Town	23 July 2010	Free
(England) Darel Russell	Norwich City	4 August 2010	Free
(Canada) Iain Hume	Barnsley	31 December 2010	Undisclosed
(England) Ian Ashbee	Hull City	31 January 2011	Free

=== Transfers out ===
Player	To	Date	Fee
(France) Youl Mawéné	Panserraikos	17 May 2010	Free
(England) Chris Sedgwick	Sheffield Wednesday	17 May 2010	Free
(England) Liam Chilvers	Notts County	17 May 2010	Free
(North Macedonia) Veliče Šumulikoski	Sibir Novosibirsk	17 May 2010	Free
(Scotland) Ross Wallace	Burnley	2 July 2010	Undisclosed
(Scotland) Neill Collins	Leeds United	7 July 2010	Undisclosed
(Scotland) Michael Hart	Hibernian	8 July 2010	Free
(Republic of Ireland) Stephen Elliott	Heart of Midlothian	7 August 2010	Free
(England) Richard Chaplow	Southampton	30 December 2010	Free
(England) Jon Parkin	Cardiff City	1 January 2011	Undisclosed

=== Loans in ===
Player	From	Date From	Date Until
(England) Matty James	Manchester United	2 July 2010	2 July 2011
(Norway) Joshua King	Manchester United	7 August 2010	14 November 2010
(England) Leon Cort	Burnley	14 November 2010	
(Canada) Iain Hume	Barnsley	17 September 2010	31 December 2010
(England) Nathan Ellington	Watford	13 January 2011	30 July 2011
(Algeria) Amine Linganzi	Blackburn Rovers	13 January 2011	30 July 2011
(England) Leon Clarke	Queens Park Rangers	28 January 2011	30 July 2011
(United States) Eddie Johnson	Fulham	31 January 2011	30 July 2011
(Scotland) Iain Turner	Everton	9 February 2011	16 May 2011
(Jamaica) Ricardo Gardner	Bolton Wanderers	8 March 2011	7 April 2011
(South Africa) Bongani Khumalo	Tottenham Hotspur	24 March 2011	30 June 2011

=== Loans out ===
Player	To	Date From	Date Until
(England) Neil Mellor	Sheffield Wednesday	5 July 2010	5 May 2011
(Republic of Ireland) Eddie Nolan	Scunthorpe United	8 July 2010	3 January 2011
(England) Darren Carter	Millwall	5 August 2010	5 November 2010
(England) Jamie Proctor	Stockport County	13 August 2010	13 September 2010

== Kit profile ==
Supplier: Puma
Sponsor(s): Tennent's

Home Strip	Away Strip
