= 2005–06 Sunderland A.F.C. season =

English football club season

Sunderland
2005–06 season
- Chairman: Bob Murray
- Manager: Mick McCarthy (until 13 February); Kevin Ball (caretaker) (from 7 March until 31 May); Niall Quinn (from 25 July)
- Stadium: Stadium of Light
- FA Premier League: 20th (relegated)
- FA Cup: Fourth round
- League Cup: Third round
- Top goalscorer: League: Liam Lawrence; Tommy Miller; Dean Whitehead; Anthony Le Tallec (3); All: Anthony Le Tallec (5)
- Highest home attendance: 44,003 (vs. Arsenal, 1 May 2006)
- Lowest home attendance: 28,226 (vs. Fulham, 4 May 2006)

During the 2005–06 season, Sunderland competed in the FA Premier League. A total of 38 matches were played in which they finished last in 20th, with 15 points.

== Season summary ==
Sunderland's season began with a streak of five consecutive losses. A brief respite came with a three-match unbeaten run before the October international break, lifting the team out of the relegation zone. However, this momentum was short-lived; a defeat to Manchester United post-break plunged them back into the bottom three, a position they never recovered from. The period between the international break and Christmas was particularly bleak, with the team losing every match.

Their second victory of the season came in late January against West Bromwich Albion, who were just above them in the standings. Cup competitions were poor as well, as Sunderland struggled against League Two's Cheltenham Town in the League Cup's first round before a 3–0 defeat to Arsenal, and suffered a demoralizing exit in the FA Cup's fourth round to League One's Brentford.

The poor performance led to the dismissal of Mick McCarthy, the manager of nearly three years, with Kevin Ball stepping in as caretaker manager. The season's modest goal became to avoid setting a new low for the fewest points in a Premier League season, a record Sunderland themselves held. Not only was the new record set, but they also broke Stoke City's 21-year record for the lowest points under the three-point-win system. Sunderland marginally improved on their previous record for the fewest goals in a top-flight season The league's new low-point record was surpassed by Derby County two years later, who recorded 11 points in contrast to Sunderland's 15.

== Transfers ==
=== In ===
| Date | Pos | Name | From | Fee |
|---|---|---|---|---|
| 3 June 2005 | FW | (Republic of Ireland) Daryl Murphy | (Republic of Ireland) Waterford United | £100,000 |
| 10 June 2005 | DF | (England) Nyron Nosworthy | (England) Gillingham | Free |
| 13 June 2005 | FW | (England) Jon Stead | (England) Blackburn Rovers | £1,800,000 |
| 14 June 2005 | GK | (England) Kelvin Davis | (England) Ipswich Town | £1,250,000 |
| 22 June 2005 | MF | (England) Tommy Miller | (England) Ipswich Town | Free |
| 6 July 2005 | MF | (Scotland) Martin Woods | (England) Leeds United | Free |
| 2 August 2005 | DF | (England) Alan Stubbs | (England) Everton | Free |
| 2 August 2005 | FW | (France) Anthony Le Tallec | (England) Liverpool | Season-long loan |
| 9 August 2005 | GK | (Republic of Ireland) Joe Murphy | (England) West Bromwich Albion | Free |
| 10 August 2005 | FW | (Scotland) Andy Gray | (England) Sheffield United | £1,100,000 |
| 24 August 2005 | MF | (France) Christian Bassila | (France) Strasbourg | Free |
| 31 August 2005 | DF | (England) Justin Hoyte | (England) Arsenal | Season-long loan |
| 25 January 2006 | FW | (Scotland) Kevin Smith | (England) Leeds United | Free |
| 31 January 2006 | MF | (Republic of Ireland) Rory Delap | (England) Southampton | Free |

=== Out ===
| Date | Pos | Name | To | Fee |
|---|---|---|---|---|
| 14 June 2005 | DF | (England) Mark Lynch | (England) Hull City | Free |
| 1 July 2005 | MF | (Northern Ireland) Jeff Whitley | (Wales) Cardiff City | Free |
| 1 July 2005 | FW | (England) Marcus Stewart | (England) Bristol City | Free |
| 1 July 2005 | FW | (England) Brian Deane | (Australia) Perth Glory | Free |
| 11 July 2005 | MF | (Republic of Ireland) Sean Thornton | (England) Doncaster Rovers | £175,000 |
| 25 July 2005 | GK | (Norway) Thomas Myhre | (Norway) Fredrikstad | Free |
| 25 July 2005 | FW | (England) Michael Bridges | (England) Bristol City | Free |
| 12 August 2005 | DF | (Scotland) Neill Collins | (England) Hartlepool United | Loan |
| 31 August 2005 | GK | (Estonia) Mart Poom | (England) Arsenal | Loan |
| 8 September 2005 | FW | (England) Chris Brown | (England) Hull City | Loan |
| 23 September 2005 | MF | (England) Grant Leadbitter | (England) Rotherham United | Loan |
| 21 October 2005 | GK | (Republic of Ireland) Joe Murphy | (England) Walsall | Loan |
| 24 November 2005 | MF | (Wales) Carl Robinson | (England) Norwich City | Loan |
| 24 November 2005 | FW | (Republic of Ireland) Daryl Murphy | (England) Sheffield Wednesday | Loan |
| 12 January 2006 | DF | (England) Dan Smith | (England) Huddersfield Town | Loan |
| 17 January 2006 | MF | (Wales) Carl Robinson | (England) Norwich City | £50,000 |
| 20 January 2006 | DF | (England) Alan Stubbs | (England) Everton | Free |
| 23 January 2006 | GK | (Estonia) Mart Poom | (England) Arsenal | Free |
| 17 February 2006 | DF | (Scotland) Neill Collins | (England) Sheffield United | Loan |
| 1 March 2006 | MF | (Scotland) Andy Welsh | (England) Leicester City | Loan |
| 16 March 2006 | FW | (Scotland) Andy Gray | (England) Burnley | Loan |

== Players ==
=== First-team squad ===
Squad at end of season

Note: Flags indicate national team as defined under FIFA eligibility rules; some limited exceptions apply. Players may hold more than one non-FIFA nationality.

| No. | Pos. | Nation | Player |
|---|---|---|---|
| 1 | GK | ENG | Kelvin Davis |
| 2 | DF | ENG | Stephen Wright |
| 3 | DF | NIR | George McCartney |
| 4 | MF | IRL | Rory Delap (Note: Delap was born in Sutton Coldfield, England, but also qualified to represent the Republic of Ireland internationally and made his international debut for the Republic of Ireland in 1998.) |
| 5 | DF | IRL | Gary Breen (captain) |
| 6 | DF | SCO | Steven Caldwell (vice-captain) |
| 7 | MF | IRL | Liam Lawrence |
| 8 | MF | ENG | Dean Whitehead |
| 9 | FW | ENG | Jon Stead |
| 10 | FW | IRL | Stephen Elliott |
| 11 | MF | SCO | Andy Welsh (Note: Welsh was born in Manchester, England, but also qualified to represent Scotland internationally and has represented Scotland at U-19 level.) |
| 12 | DF | ENG | Nyron Nosworthy (Note: Nosworthy was born in Brixton, England, but also qualified to represent Jamaica internationally through his father and Guyana internationally through his mother, and would make his international debut for Jamaica in May 2012.) |
| 13 | GK | ENG | Ben Alnwick |
| 14 | MF | ENG | Tommy Miller |

| No. | Pos. | Nation | Player |
|---|---|---|---|
| 15 | DF | WAL | Danny Collins (Note: Collins was born in Chester, England, and represented them at C level, but also qualified to represent Wales internationally and made his international debut for Wales in February 2005.) |
| 16 | FW | SCO | Kevin Kyle |
| 17 | FW | FRA | Anthony Le Tallec (on loan from Liverpool) |
| 18 | FW | SCO | Andy Gray (Note: Gray was born in Harrogate, England, but also qualified to represent Scotland internationally and made his international debut for Scotland in April 2003.) |
| 19 | MF | SCO | Martin Woods |
| 20 | FW | ENG | Chris Brown |
| 23 | MF | ENG | Grant Leadbitter |
| 25 | DF | SCO | Neill Collins |
| 26 | FW | IRL | Daryl Murphy |
| 28 | DF | ENG | Dan Smith |
| 30 | GK | IRL | Joe Murphy |
| 31 | MF | FRA | Christian Bassila |
| 32 | DF | ENG | Justin Hoyte (Note: Hoyte was born in Waltham Forest, England, and represented them at U-16, U-19, U-20, and U-21 level, but also qualified to represent Trinidad and Tobago internationally and made his international debut for Trinidad and Tobago in March 2013.) (on loan from Arsenal) |
| 33 | MF | ARG | Julio Arca |

=== Left club during season ===
Note: Flags indicate national team as defined under FIFA eligibility rules; some limited exceptions apply. Players may hold more than one non-FIFA nationality.

| No. | Pos. | Nation | Player |
|---|---|---|---|
| 4 | MF | WAL | Carl Robinson (to Norwich City) |
| 21 | MF | ENG | Matt Piper (released) |
| 22 | DF | ENG | Alan Stubbs (to Everton) |

| No. | Pos. | Nation | Player |
|---|---|---|---|
| 24 | GK | EST | Mart Poom (to Arsenal) |
| — | MF | IRL | Colin Healy (to Livingston) |

== Reserve squad ==
Note: Flags indicate national team as defined under FIFA eligibility rules; some limited exceptions apply. Players may hold more than one non-FIFA nationality.

| No. | Pos. | Nation | Player |
|---|---|---|---|
| 21 | FW | SCO | Kevin Smith |
| 24 | GK | NIR | Trevor Carson |

| No. | Pos. | Nation | Player |
|---|---|---|---|
| 27 | DF | ENG | Ben Christensen |
| 29 | DF | ENG | Sean Taylor |

== Results ==
Sunderland's score comes first.

| Win | Draw | Loss |

=== League Cup ===
| Round | Date | Opponent | Venue | Result | Attendance | Goalscorers |
|---|---|---|---|---|---|---|
| 2nd | 20 September 2005 | Cheltenham Town | Stadium of Light | 1–0 (after extra time) | 11,969 | Le Tallec |
| 3rd | 25 October 2005 | Arsenal | Stadium of Light | 0–3 | 47,366 | |

=== FA Cup ===
| Round | Date | Opponent | Venue | Result | Attendance | Goalscorers |
|---|---|---|---|---|---|---|
| 3rd | 8 January 2006 | Northwich Victoria | Stadium of Light | 3–0 | 19,323 | N. Collins, Whitehead, Le Tallec |
| 4th | 28 January 2006 | Brentford | Griffin Park | 1–2 | 11,698 | Arca |

=== Premier League ===
| Pos | Team | Pld | W | D | L | GF | GA | GD | Pts | Qualification or relegation |
|---|---|---|---|---|---|---|---|---|---|---|
| 16 | Aston Villa | 38 | 10 | 12 | 16 | 42 | 55 | −13 | 42 | |
| 17 | Portsmouth | 38 | 10 | 8 | 20 | 37 | 62 | −25 | 38 | |
| 18 | Birmingham City (R) | 38 | 8 | 10 | 20 | 28 | 50 | −22 | 34 | Relegation to the Football League Championship |
| 19 | West Bromwich Albion (R) | 38 | 7 | 9 | 22 | 31 | 58 | −27 | 30 | Relegation to the Football League Championship |
| 20 | Sunderland (R) | 38 | 3 | 6 | 29 | 26 | 69 | −43 | 15 | Relegation to the Football League Championship |

Source: Barclays Premier League
Rules for classification: 1) points; 2) goal difference; 3) number of goals scored.
(R) Relegated

==== Results by matchday ====
| Matchday | 1 | 2 | 3 | 4 | 5 | 6 | 7 | 8 | 9 | 10 | 11 | 12 | 13 | 14 | 15 | 16 | 17 | 18 | 19 | 20 | 21 | 22 | 23 | 24 | 25 | 26 | 27 | 28 | 29 | 30 | 31 | 32 | 33 | 34 | 35 | 36 | 37 | 38 |
|---|---|---|---|---|---|---|---|---|---|---|---|---|---|---|---|---|---|---|---|---|---|---|---|---|---|---|---|---|---|---|---|---|---|---|---|---|---|---|
| Result | L | L | L | L | L | D | W | D | L | L | L | L | L | L | L | L | L | D | L | L | L | W | L | L | D | L | L | L | L | L | L | D | D | L | L | L | W | L |
| Position | 18 | 20 | 20 | 20 | 20 | 20 | 19 | 17 | 19 | 19 | 20 | 20 | 20 | 20 | 20 | 20 | 20 | 20 | 20 | 20 | 20 | 20 | 20 | 20 | 20 | 20 | 20 | 20 | 20 | 20 | 20 | 20 | 20 | 20 | 20 | 20 | 20 | 20 |

W = Win; D = Draw; L = Loss

| Date | Opponent | Venue | Result | Attendance | Scorers |
|---|---|---|---|---|---|
| 13 August 2005 | Charlton Athletic | Stadium of Light | 1–3 | 34,446 | Gray |
| 20 August 2005 | Liverpool | Anfield | 0–1 | 44,913 | |
| 23 August 2005 | Manchester City | Stadium of Light | 1–2 | 33,357 | Le Tallec |
| 27 August 2005 | Wigan Athletic | JJB Stadium | 0–1 | 17,223 | |
| 10 September 2005 | Chelsea | Stamford Bridge | 0–2 | 41,969 | |
| 17 September 2005 | West Bromwich Albion | Stadium of Light | 1–1 | 31,657 | Breen |
| 25 September 2005 | Middlesbrough | Riverside Stadium | 2–0 | 29,583 | Miller, Arca |
| 1 October 2005 | West Ham United | Stadium of Light | 1–1 | 31,212 | Miller |
| 15 October 2005 | Manchester United | Stadium of Light | 1–3 | 39,085 | Elliott |
| 23 October 2005 | Newcastle United | St James' Park | 2–3 | 52,302 | Lawrence, Elliott |
| 29 October 2005 | Portsmouth | Stadium of Light | 1–4 | 34,926 | Whitehead (pen) |
| 5 November 2005 | Arsenal | Highbury | 1–3 | 38,210 | Stubbs |
| 19 November 2005 | Aston Villa | Stadium of Light | 1–3 | 39,707 | Whitehead (pen) |
| 26 November 2005 | Birmingham City | Stadium of Light | 0–1 | 32,442 | |
| 30 November 2005 | Liverpool | Stadium of Light | 0–2 | 32,697 | |
| 3 December 2005 | Tottenham Hotspur | White Hart Lane | 2–3 | 36,244 | Whitehead, Le Tallec |
| 10 December 2005 | Charlton Athletic | The Valley | 0–2 | 26,065 | |
| 26 December 2005 | Bolton Wanderers | Stadium of Light | 0–0 | 32,232 | |
| 31 December 2005 | Everton | Stadium of Light | 0–1 | 30,567 | |
| 2 January 2006 | Fulham | Craven Cottage | 1–2 | 19,372 | Lawrence |
| 15 January 2006 | Chelsea | Stadium of Light | 1–2 | 32,420 | Lawrence |
| 21 January 2006 | West Bromwich Albion | The Hawthorns | 1–0 | 26,464 | Watson (own goal) |
| 31 January 2006 | Middlesbrough | Stadium of Light | 0–3 | 31,675 | |
| 4 February 2006 | West Ham United | Boleyn Ground | 0–2 | 34,745 | |
| 12 February 2006 | Tottenham Hotspur | Stadium of Light | 1–1 | 34,700 | Murphy |
| 15 February 2006 | Blackburn Rovers | Ewood Park | 0–2 | 18,220 | |
| 25 February 2006 | Birmingham City | St. Andrew's | 0–1 | 29,257 | |
| 3 March 2006 | Manchester City | City of Manchester Stadium | 1–2 | 42,200 | Kyle |
| 11 March 2006 | Wigan Athletic | Stadium of Light | 0–1 | 31,194 | |
| 18 March 2006 | Bolton Wanderers | Reebok Stadium | 0–2 | 23,568 | |
| 25 March 2006 | Blackburn Rovers | Stadium of Light | 0–1 | 29,593 | |
| 1 April 2006 | Everton | Goodison Park | 2–2 | 38,093 | Stead, Delap |
| 14 April 2006 | Manchester United | Old Trafford | 0–0 | 72,519 | |
| 17 April 2006 | Newcastle United | Stadium of Light | 1–4 | 40,032 | Hoyte |
| 22 April 2006 | Portsmouth | Fratton Park | 1–2 | 20,078 | Miller |
| 1 May 2006 | Arsenal | Stadium of Light | 0–3 | 44,003 | |
| 4 May 2006 | Fulham | Stadium of Light | 2–1 | 28,226 | Le Tallec, Brown |
| 7 May 2006 | Aston Villa | Villa Park | 1–2 | 33,820 | D. Collins |

=== Friendlies ===
| Date | Opponent | Venue | Result | Attendance | Goalscorers |
|---|---|---|---|---|---|
| 16 July 2005 | Vancouver Whitecaps | Swangard Stadium (Burnaby, British Columbia) | 0–3 | 6,857 | |
| 20 July 2005 | Seattle Sounders | Qwest Field (Seattle, Washington) | 1–0 | 8,502 | Lawrence |
| 23 July 2005 | Portland Timbers | PGE Park (Portland, Oregon) | 0–0 | 15,376 | |

== Statistics ==
=== Appearances and goals ===
| No. | Pos | Nat | Player | Total | | Premier League | | FA Cup | | League Cup | |
| No. | Pos | Nat | Player | Apps | Goals | Apps | Goals | Apps | Goals | Apps | Goals |
Goalkeepers
| 1 | GK | (England) ENG | Kelvin Davis | 35 | 0 | 33 | 0 | 2 | 0 | 0 | 0 |
| 13 | GK | (England) ENG | Ben Alnwick | 7 | 0 | 5 | 0 | 0 | 0 | 2 | 0 |
Defenders
| 2 | DF | (England) ENG | Stephen Wright | 2 | 0 | 2 | 0 | 0 | 0 | 0 | 0 |
| 3 | DF | (Northern Ireland) NIR | George McCartney | 13 | 0 | 13 | 0 | 0 | 0 | 0 | 0 |
| 5 | DF | (Republic of Ireland) IRL | Gary Breen | 36 | 1 | 33+2 | 1 | 1 | 0 | 0 | 0 |
| 6 | DF | (Scotland) SCO | Steven Caldwell | 25 | 1 | 23 | 1 | 0 | 0 | 2 | 0 |
| 12 | DF | (England) ENG | Nyron Nosworthy | 32 | 0 | 24+6 | 0 | 0 | 0 | 2 | 0 |
| 15 | DF | (Wales) WAL | Danny Collins | 27 | 1 | 22+1 | 1 | 2 | 0 | 2 | 0 |
| 28 | DF | (England) ENG | Dan Smith | 5 | 0 | 1+2 | 0 | 0 | 0 | 1+1 | 0 |
| 32 | DF | (England) ENG | Justin Hoyte | 30 | 1 | 27 | 1 | 2 | 0 | 1 | 0 |
| 33 | DF | (Argentina) ARG | Julio Arca | 26 | 2 | 22+2 | 1 | 2 | 1 | 0 | 0 |
Midfielders
| 4 | MF | (Republic of Ireland) IRL | Rory Delap | 6 | 1 | 5+1 | 1 | 0 | 0 | 0 | 0 |
| 7 | MF | (Republic of Ireland) IRL | Liam Lawrence | 33 | 3 | 19+10 | 3 | 2 | 0 | 2 | 0 |
| 8 | MF | (England) ENG | Dean Whitehead | 41 | 4 | 37 | 3 | 2 | 1 | 0+2 | 0 |
| 11 | MF | (Scotland) SCO | Andy Welsh | 16 | 0 | 11+2 | 0 | 0+1 | 0 | 1+1 | 0 |
| 14 | MF | (England) ENG | Tommy Miller | 31 | 3 | 27+2 | 3 | 2 | 0 | 0 | 0 |
| 19 | MF | (England) ENG | Martin Woods | 8 | 0 | 1+6 | 0 | 0 | 0 | 1 | 0 |
| 23 | MF | (England) ENG | Grant Leadbitter | 12 | 0 | 8+4 | 0 | 0 | 0 | 0 | 0 |
| 31 | MF | (France) FRA | Christian Bassila | 14 | 0 | 12+1 | 0 | 0 | 0 | 1 | 0 |
Forwards
| 9 | FW | (England) ENG | Jon Stead | 34 | 1 | 21+9 | 1 | 2 | 0 | 2 | 0 |
| 10 | FW | (Republic of Ireland) IRL | Stephen Elliott | 16 | 2 | 11+4 | 2 | 0 | 0 | 0+1 | 0 |
| 16 | FW | (Scotland) SCO | Kevin Kyle | 14 | 1 | 9+4 | 1 | 1 | 0 | 0 | 0 |
| 17 | FW | (France) FRA | Anthony Le Tallec | 31 | 5 | 12+15 | 3 | 1+1 | 1 | 2 | 1 |
| 18 | FW | (Scotland) SCO | Andy Gray | 22 | 1 | 13+8 | 1 | 0+1 | 0 | 0 | 0 |
| 20 | FW | (England) ENG | Chris Brown | 13 | 1 | 10+3 | 1 | 0 | 0 | 0 | 0 |
| 26 | FW | (Republic of Ireland) IRL | Daryl Murphy | 20 | 1 | 5+13 | 1 | 0+1 | 0 | 0+1 | 0 |
Players transferred out during the season
| 4 | MF | (Wales) WAL | Carl Robinson | 7 | 0 | 3+2 | 0 | 0 | 0 | 2 | 0 |
| 21 | MF | (England) ENG | Matt Piper | 1 | 0 | 0 | 0 | 0 | 0 | 1 | 0 |
| 22 | DF | (England) ENG | Alan Stubbs | 11 | 1 | 8+2 | 1 | 1 | 0 | 0 | 0 |
