= Alan Brown (footballer, born 1959) =

English footballer

Personal information
- Full name: Alan Brown
- Date of birth: 22 May 1959 (age 67)
- Place of birth: Easington, County Durham, England
- Position: Forward

Senior career*
| Years | Team | Apps | (Gls) |
| 1976–1982 | Sunderland | 103 | (21) |
| 1981 | → Newcastle United (loan) | 5 | (3) |
| 1982–1984 | Shrewsbury Town | 65 | (15) |
| 1984–1986 | Doncaster Rovers | 15 | (6) |
- * Club domestic league appearances and goals

Alan Brown (born 22 May 1959) is an English former professional footballer who played as a forward for Sunderland, Shrewsbury Town, and Doncaster Rovers.

Brown was signed by Doncaster Rovers' manager Billy Bremner from Shrewsbury Town for £35,000 in March 1984. The 1984–85 season started well for Brown with a hat-trick in a win at Reading, however he was injured a little later in the season and despite a two-game comeback the following season he was forced to retire from the game. He made 17 appearances for Rovers, scoring 7 goals.

He is the father of former footballer Chris Brown.
