= Carl Robinson =

Welsh footballer and coach (born 1976)

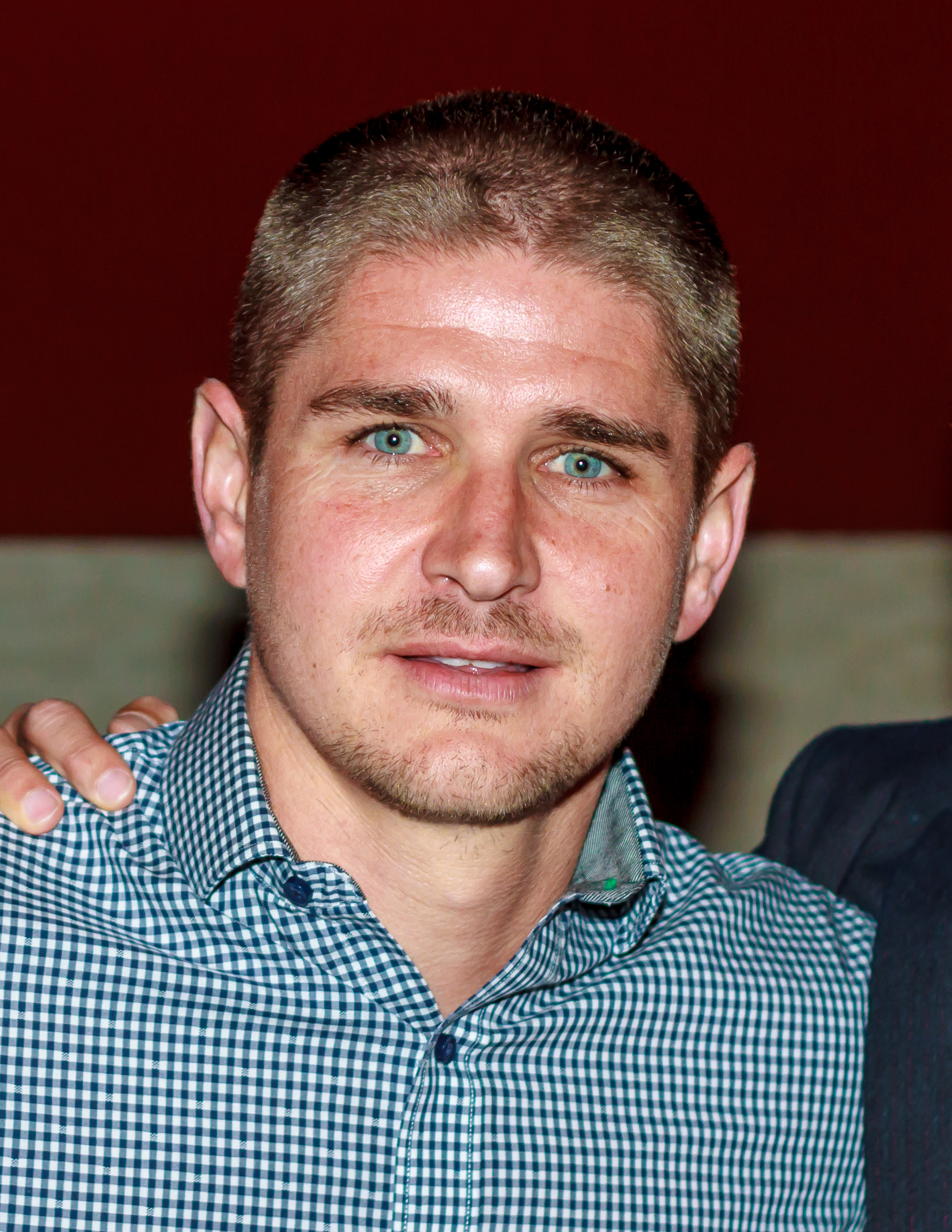
- Robinson with Vancouver in 2015

Personal information
- Full name: Carl Philip Robinson
- Date of birth: 13 October 1976 (age 50)
- Place of birth: Llandrindod Wells, Wales
- Height: 5 ft 10 in (1.78 m)
- Position: Midfielder

Youth career
- Wolverhampton Wanderers

Senior career*
Years	Team	Apps	(Gls)
1995–2002	Wolverhampton Wanderers	154	(19)
1996	→ Shrewsbury Town (loan)	4	(0)
2002–2004	Portsmouth	16	(0)
2003	→ Sheffield Wednesday (loan)	4	(1)
2003	→ Walsall (loan)	11	(1)
2003	→ Rotherham United (loan)	14	(0)
2004	→ Sheffield United (loan)	5	(0)
2004	→ Sunderland (loan)	7	(1)
2004–2006	Sunderland	45	(4)
2005–2006	→ Norwich City (loan)	7	(0)
2006–2007	Norwich City	42	(2)
2007–2010	Toronto FC	74	(3)
2010–2011	New York Red Bulls	12	(1)
Total		406	(32)

International career
1995–1997	Wales U21	6	(0)
1998	Wales B	2	(0)
1999–2009	Wales	52	(1)

Managerial career
- 2013–2018: Vancouver Whitecaps FC
- 2020: Newcastle Jets
- 2020–2022: Western Sydney Wanderers
- * Club domestic league appearances and goals

Carl Philip Robinson (born 13 October 1976) is a Welsh former international footballer who played as a central midfielder. He is currently the assistant coach at Atlanta United FC.

== Early life ==
Robinson was born and raised in Llandrindod Wells, where he attended Oxford Road Primary School and Llandrindod High School.

== Club career ==
=== Wolverhampton Wanderers ===
Robinson started his career as a trainee with Wolverhampton Wanderers. He was promoted to the first-team for the 1995–96 season.

==== Loan to Shrewsbury Town ====
On 28 March 1996, Robinson was sent on loan to Shrewsbury Town for the remainder of the season to gain first-team experience. Two days later, Robinson made his professional debut against Hull City in a 1–1 draw at Gay Meadow in front of 2,346 supporters. He made five appearances for The Shrews: four in the league and one in The Football League Trophy final at Wembley Stadium in a 2–1 defeat against Rotherham United on 14 April 1996.

==== Return to Wolves ====
Following his loan spell at Shrewsbury Town, Robinson returned to Wolves for the 1996–97 season, making his club debut that year. He would go on to become a regular with the first-team over the next six seasons as the club challenged regularly for promotion to the Premier League and made a memorable run to the semifinals of the 1997–98 FA Cup, losing to eventual champions Arsenal. Robinson was released by Wolves in June 2002 at the expiry of his contract.

=== Portsmouth ===
After over 180 appearances for Wolves over six seasons, he moved to Portsmouth in July 2002 under the Bosman ruling. He played 15 league games for Portsmouth in the first half of their Championship season before finishing the season with loan spells at Sheffield Wednesday (where he scored once against future club Norwich) and Walsall, where he scored once against Bradford City. The following season he was loaned out again, this time to Rotherham, Sheffield United and Sunderland. However between these loan spells he did return to Portsmouth to make one Premier League appearance against Chelsea.

=== Sunderland ===
After impressing at Sunderland he signed a three-year deal in June 2004. He then went on to collect another championship winners medal as they gained promotion during a season in which he played 42 of 46 matches to become a fan's favourite.

=== Norwich City ===
After a loan spell with Norwich City, he signed for The Canaries permanently on a 2.5 year deal for an undisclosed fee in January 2006. Robinson scored his first goal for Norwich in a 5–1 win against Barnsley on 26 August 2006.

=== Toronto FC ===
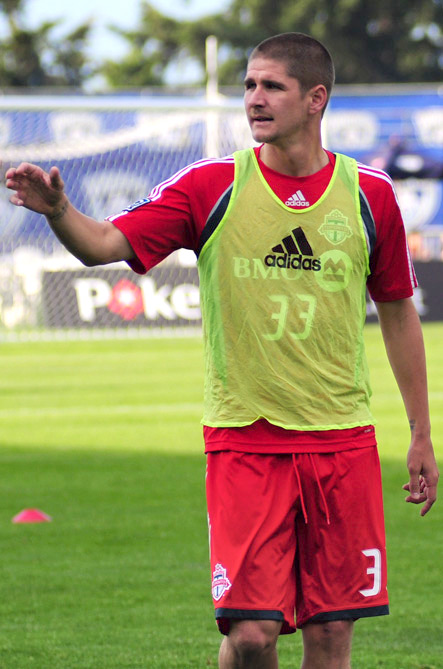
Robinson in 2009

On 31 January 2007, Robinson joined Toronto FC from Norwich after just over a year at Carrow Road, even though he still had 18 months remaining on his deal with Norwich. He scored his first MLS goal when he netted Toronto's third in a 4–0 win against FC Dallas on 17 June 2007. He was voted team MVP in his first year and repeated in his second year at the club.

=== New York Red Bulls ===
In March 2010 he was traded from Toronto FC to the New York Red Bulls to join Hans Backe for a fourth-round pick in the 2011 MLS SuperDraft. On 20 March 2010, Robinson started for New York in a 3–1 victory against Santos FC, which was the first match played at the new Red Bull Arena. On 21 August 2010, he scored his first goal for New York Red Bulls in a 4–1 road victory against his old club Toronto FC and refused to celebrate due to his relationship with the supporters. During his time at New York Red Bulls he became a player coach.

== International career ==
A Wales international player, Robinson made his debut against Belarus in 1999, winning the man of the match award. His 50th cap came in the 2–0 World Cup Qualifier victory over Liechtenstein. On 1 April 2009, Robinson announced his retirement from international football at the age of 32 with 52 caps after Wales suffered two consecutive defeats, making it virtually impossible for them to qualify for the 2010 FIFA World Cup.

== Coaching career ==
=== Vancouver Whitecaps FC ===
In January 2012, Robinson retired as a player and joined the Vancouver Whitecaps FC as an assistant coach. He took over as the head coach of the club in December 2013. The club parted ways with Robinson on 25 September with 5 games remaining in the 2018 season after just under 5 years. He amassed just under 200 games as Caps boss in his stay.

=== Newcastle Jets ===
In February 2020, Robinson signed a three-and-a-half-year contract as the head coach of Australian A-League club Newcastle Jets. On 14 October 2020, the Jets announced that Robinson was in talks with Western Sydney Wanderers.

=== Western Sydney Wanderers ===
On 15 October 2020, Western Sydney Wanderers announced the signing of Robinson from Newcastle Jets. On 30 January 2022 Wanderers relieved Robinson of his duties and thanked him for his time at the club.

=== Birmingham City ===
Having worked with Wayne Rooney at Major League Soccer club D.C. United, Robinson followed him to EFL Championship club Birmingham City in October 2023 as a first-team coach. After fifteen matches, which included nine defeats and only two wins, Rooney and Robinson were dismissed on 2 January 2024.

=== Atlanta United ===
On 13 June 2024, Robinson joined MLS side Atlanta United as an assistant coach. Initially working under interim manager Rob Valentino, he continued his role after the permanent appointment of Ronny Deila in December 2024.

== Career statistics ==
Appearances and goals by club, season and competition
Club	Season	League			National cup (Note: Includes FA Cup, Canadian Championship, U.S. Open Cup)		League cup (Note: Includes Football League Cup, Football League Trophy)		Continental (Note: Includes CONCACAF Champions League)		Total	
Club	Season	Division	Apps	Goals	Apps	Goals	Apps	Goals	Apps	Goals	Apps	Goals
Shrewsbury Town (loan)	1995–96	Second Division	4	0	0	0	1	0	–		5	0
Wolverhampton Wanderers	1995–96	First Division	0	0	0	0	0	0	—		0	0
Wolverhampton Wanderers	1996–97	First Division	2	0	0	0	0	0	—		2	0
Wolverhampton Wanderers	1997–98	First Division	32	3	7	1	4	0	—		43	4
Wolverhampton Wanderers	1998–99	First Division	24	8	2	0	1	0	—		27	8
Wolverhampton Wanderers	1999–2000	First Division	33	3	3	1	2	0	—		38	4
Wolverhampton Wanderers	2000–01	First Division	40	3	2	1	5	1	—		47	5
Wolverhampton Wanderers	2001–02	First Division	23	2	0	0	1	0	—		24	2
Wolverhampton Wanderers	Total		154	19	14	3	13	1	—		181	23
Portsmouth	2002–03	First Division	15	0	0	0	2	0	—		17	0
Portsmouth	2003–04	Premier League	1	0	2	0	—		—		3	0
Portsmouth	Total		16	0	2	0	2	0	—		20	0
Sheffield Wednesday (loan)	2002–03	First Division	4	1	0	0	—		—		4	1
Walsall (loan)	2002–03	First Division	11	1	0	0	—		—		11	1
Rotherham United (loan)	2003–04	Championship	14	0	—		2	0	—		16	0
Sheffield United (loan)	2003–04	Championship	5	0	—		—		—		5	0
Sunderland (loan)	2003–04	Championship	7	1	—		—		—		7	1
Sunderland	2004–05	Championship	40	4	2	0	1	0	—		43	4
Sunderland	2005–06	Premier League	5	0	0	0	2	0	—		7	0
Sunderland	Total		52	5	2	0	3	0	—		57	5
Norwich City	2005–06	Championship	22	0	0	0	0	0	—		22	0
Norwich City	2006–07	Championship	27	2	2	0	0	0	—		29	2
Norwich City	Total		49	2	2	0	0	0	—		51	2
Toronto FC	2007	MLS	26	2	—		—		—		26	2
Toronto FC	2008	MLS	27	1	4	0	—		—		31	1
Toronto FC	2009	MLS	21	0	4	0	—		2	0	27	0
Toronto FC	Total		74	3	8	0	—		2	0	84	3
New York Red Bulls	2010	MLS	10	1	0	0	—		—		10	1
New York Red Bulls	2011	MLS	2	0	0	0	—		—		2	0
New York Red Bulls	Total		12	1	0	0	—		—		12	1
Career total			392	32	28	3	20	1	2	0	415	36

== Managerial statistics ==
As of match played 18 May 2022

Managerial record by team and tenure
Team	Nat	From	To	Record							
Team	Nat	From	To	G	W	D	L	GF	GA	GD	Win %
Vancouver Whitecaps	(Canada)	16 December 2013	25 September 2018	199	78	49	72	276	275	+1	39.20
Newcastle Jets	(Australia)	6 February 2020	15 October 2020	11	7	3	1	19	9	+10	63.64
Western Sydney Wanderers	(Australia)	15 October 2020	30 January 2022	35	11	11	13	55	41	+14	31.43
Total				245	95	63	87	350	325	+25	38.78

== Honours ==
=== Player ===
Shrewsbury Town

- Football League Trophy runner-up: 1995–96

Portsmouth

- Football League First Division: 2002–03

Sunderland

- Football League Championship: 2004–05

Individual

- Red Patch Boys Player of the Year: 2007, 2008
- Sunderland Supporters' Player of Year: 2004

=== Manager ===
Vancouver Whitecaps

- 2014 – Western conference playoffs
- 2015 – Runner up Western Conference / Western conference semifinals
- 2015 – Coach of year candidate
- 2015 – Canadian Voyageurs Cup winner
- 2016 – Concacaf Champions league semifinals
- 2016 – Canadian Voyageurs Cup runner-up
- 2017 – Western Conference semifinals
- 2017 – Coach of year candidate
- 2018 – Canadian Voyageurs Cup runner-up

Newcastle Jets

- Coach of year candidate: 2020
