= George McCartney (footballer) =

Northern Irish footballer (born 1981)

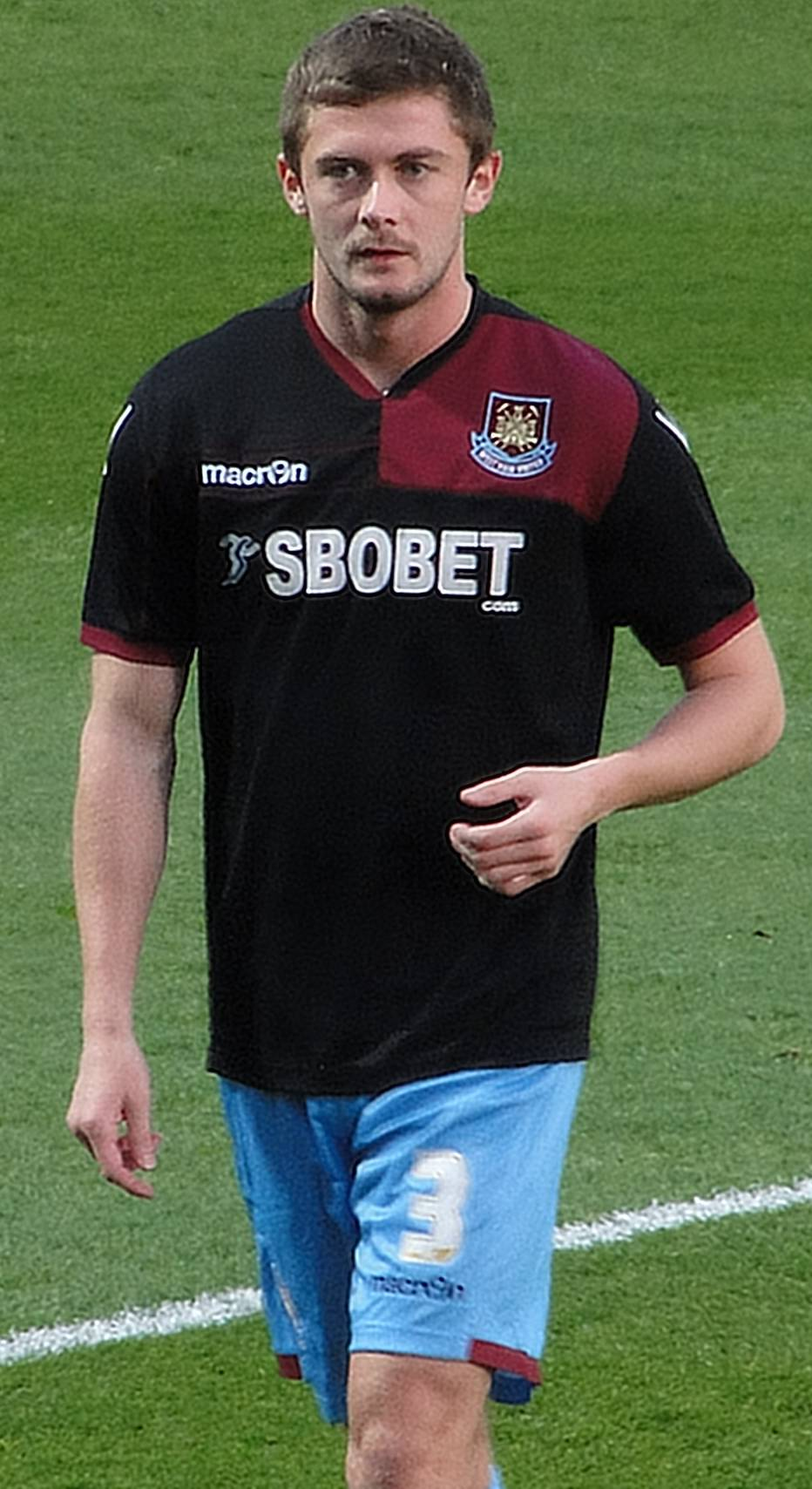
- McCartney warming-up for West Ham United in 2012

Personal information
- Full name: George McCartney
- Date of birth: 29 April 1981 (age 45)
- Place of birth: Belfast, Northern Ireland
- Height: 6 ft 0 in (1.83 m)
- Position: Left-back

Youth career
- –1998: Sunderland

Senior career*
Years	Team	Apps	(Gls)
1998–2006	Sunderland	134	(0)
2006–2008	West Ham United	61	(1)
2008–2012	Sunderland	41	(0)
2010–2011	→ Leeds United (loan)	17	(0)
2011	→ Leeds United (loan)	15	(0)
2011–2012	→ West Ham United (loan)	38	(1)
2012–2014	West Ham United	34	(0)
2024	Ballynahinch United	2	(0)
Total		342	(2)

International career
2000	Northern Ireland U18	4	(0)
2000–2001	Northern Ireland U21	5	(0)
2001–2010	Northern Ireland	34	(1)
- * Club domestic league appearances and goals

George McCartney (born 29 April 1981) is a Northern Irish former footballer who is a coach at Linfield. He began his career at Sunderland in 1998 before having two spells each with West Ham United and Leeds United. He won the 2004–05 Football League Championship with Sunderland and was named the club's player of the season award as well as being named in the 2004–05 Football League Championship PFA Team of the Year. He moved to West Ham in 2006 before returning to Sunderland under Roy Keane's managership in 2008. He spent one season, the 2010–11 season, on loan with Leeds United before returning in 2011 to play on loan for West Ham. From 2001 until 2010 he also played international football for Northern Ireland.

== Club career ==
=== Sunderland ===
Born in Belfast, McCartney was a trainee with Sunderland before signing a professional contract on 28 May 1998 and made his debut against Luton Town in the League Cup in 2000. He was made team captain in 2003–04 after Jason McAteer suffered a long-term injury and in 2004–05 was voted Player of the Season by Sunderland fans during the successful Championship winning campaign.

During the season his excellent performances earned him the title "Mr. Consistent" from manager Mick McCarthy. McCartney missed a large percentage of Sunderland's ill-fated 2005–06 season due to injury. He showed glimpses of his potential once he had regained his fitness, but his return came far too late in the season for him to have any meaningful impact on the team's dreadful run of results. He made 157 appearances for Sunderland in all competitions.

=== West Ham United ===
McCartney during his first spell at West Ham United.

On 8 August 2006, McCartney moved to West Ham United in a four-year deal, in exchange for Clive Clarke and an additional £600,000. He made his debut in the team's 2–1 defeat to Chesterfield in the League Cup on 24 October 2006. After initially spending most of his time as substitute, regular left back Paul Konchesky joined Fulham and as a result McCartney eventually became a first team regular under Alan Curbishley and his strong forward runs and crosses played a crucial role in West Ham's eventual escape from relegation.

He went on to make 25 appearances in all competitions for West Ham during the 2006–07 season. McCartney scored his first goal for The Hammers, a strong back post header, in a friendly against Roma one week before the start of the 2007–08 season. He scored his first Premier League goal for West Ham in the 1–1 home draw with Bolton Wanderers on 4 November 2007 with a magnificent volley. At the end of the 2007–2008 season McCartney received the runner up Hammer of the Year Award, having played in all 38 Premiership games. McCartney's sale back to his former club Sunderland led to West Ham manager Alan Curbishley resigning after he claimed the player was sold against his wishes.

=== Return to Sunderland ===
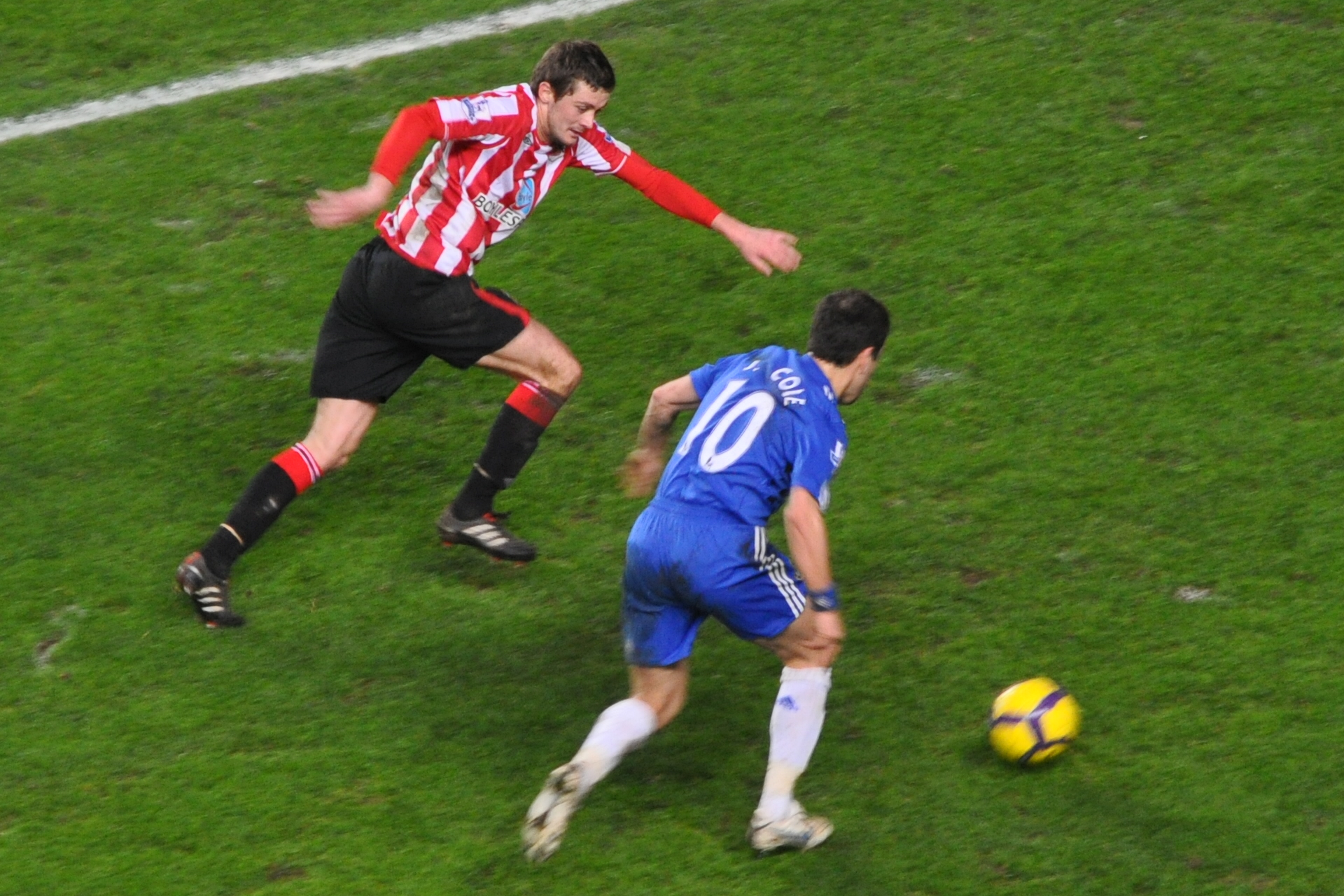
McCartney playing for Sunderland against Chelsea.

McCartney rejoined former club Sunderland on 1 September 2008, signing a five-year contract for an undisclosed fee. He was a regular under manager Roy Keane, but after Steve Bruce became manager McCartney picked up an ankle injury in March 2010 and lost his place in the team to Anton Ferdinand whilst out injured. McCartney wasn't given a squad number for the 2010–11 season after suffering a knee injury in 2010–11 pre-season on a tour of Portugal. However, he was included in Sunderland's 25 man Premier League squad. Kieran Richardson changed his squad number and was given the number 3 shirt for the 2010–11 season where he became Sunderland's first choice left back and McCartney was given the number 23 jersey.

=== Leeds United loan ===
In order to help him regain match fitness after suffering a knee injury in pre-season and losing his first-team place at Sunderland, he joined Leeds United on 23 September 2010, initially on a one-month loan, a move which saw him link up with Northern Ireland assistant manager Glynn Snodin. On 25 September, he made his Leeds debut in a 1–0 victory in the Yorkshire derby against Sheffield United. In his second game, Leeds suffered a 6–4 defeat to Preston North End, and McCartney gave away a penalty in the match which was scored by Callum Davidson. On 4 October Leeds announced that McCartney's loan had been extended by a further two days so he could play in the game against Cardiff City.

On 30 October 2010 McCartney signed a one-month extension to his loan deal and made an appearance against Scunthorpe United on the same day. His loan was extended for a third month on 1 December. McCartney's loan expired on 30 December and he returned to Sunderland with Leeds attempting to extend the loan deal once the transfer window had re-opened in January 2011. On 14 January 2011, McCartney re-signed for Leeds on loan until the end of the 2010–11 season. After McCartney gave an interview where he stated that Leeds players were jaded hence the poor run of form late on in the season, he was criticised by Leeds chairman Ken Bates who revealed his anger at McCartney and that he had been fined on several occasions for turning up late to training. At the end of his loan he returned to his parent club Sunderland.

=== Return to West Ham United ===
On 10 August 2011 McCartney returned for another spell at West Ham United for a season-long loan.

On 19 December, McCartney was quoted as saying although Martin O'Neill had taken over at his club Sunderland, he had had no contact with the manager, and "To be honest, before I agreed to come to West Ham, it was decided that my contract would be left to run out in the summer and sorted out at the end of the season. "So there is no chance of a call back and no chance of me ever going back to Sunderland."

On 4 March 2012, he scored his only goal for West Ham since returning on loan, in a 2–0 away victory over Cardiff City. At the end of season awards for the 2011–12 season, he was awarded the club's Players' Player of the Year award. His performances have also helped West Ham clinch promotion back to the Premier League after winning the play-off finals.

On 1 July 2012 McCartney rejoined newly promoted West Ham signing a two-year contract after agreeing to make the loan move permanent. In November McCartney suffered a serious knee injury playing against Liverpool. He made his comeback on 30 March 2013 against West Bromwich Albion but lasted only 15 minutes before a recurrence of the same injury which was expected to keep him from playing for the remainder of the 2012–13 season. McCartney returned to the first team for a League Cup game against Cheltenham Town on 27 August 2013. His Premier League return however was not until 30 November 2013, in a 3–0 win against Fulham. McCartney was released by West Ham at the end of the 2013–14 season. McCartney had played 82 games in all competitions in his second spell with the club, scoring a single goal.

=== Ballynahinch United ===
In 2024, George signed for Northern Amateur Football League (NAFL) side Ballynahinch United in Northern Ireland and played two games in Division 1C. In his second game, he set up Ballynahinch United's only goal of the game. McCartney also featured for the club's reserve team in the Newcastle District and Football Association League (NADAFL) in Division 2.

== International career ==
McCartney was capped four times for Northern Ireland national under-18 team during 2000 before earning five caps for the under-21 team from 2000 to 2001. He made his debut for the senior team in September 2001 in their World Cup qualifying win against Iceland, scoring his only goal in his professional career until that for West Ham in 2007. In 2005, he fell out with the then manager of the Northern Ireland senior team, Lawrie Sanchez and retired from international football.

However, after Nigel Worthington took charge of the national team, McCartney stated his willingness to return and on 22 August 2007, he came out of international retirement and returned to international football in the 3–1 win against Liechtenstein. Following regular run of games for Leeds, in November 2010 McCartney was recalled to the Northern Ireland Squad. In February 2011 McCartney was called into the Northern Ireland squad to face Scotland, but on 8 February 2011 he once again announced his retirement from international football.

== Coaching career ==
During the 2021–22 NIFL Premiership season, McCartney joined Linfield as a coach, reuniting with former Northern Irish teammate David Healy.

== Career statistics ==
Appearances and goals by club, season and competition
Club	Season	League			FA Cup		League Cup		Other		Total	
Club	Season	Division	Apps	Goals	Apps	Goals	Apps	Goals	Apps	Goals	Apps	Goals
Sunderland	2000–01	Premier League	2	0	1	0	3	0	0	0	6	0
Sunderland	2001–02	Premier League	18	0	1	0	1	0	0	0	20	0
Sunderland	2002–03	Premier League	24	0	3	0	3	0	0	0	30	0
Sunderland	2003–04	First Division	41	0	6	0	1	0	2	0	50	0
Sunderland	2004–05	Championship	36	0	2	0	0	0	0	0	38	0
Sunderland	2005–06	Premier League	13	0	0	0	0	0	0	0	13	0
Sunderland	Total		134	0	13	0	8	0	2	0	157	0
West Ham United	2006–07	Premier League	22	0	2	0	1	0	0	0	25	0
West Ham United	2007–08	Premier League	38	1	2	0	4	0	0	0	44	1
West Ham United	2008–09	Premier League	1	0	0	0	1	0	0	0	2	0
West Ham United	Total		61	1	4	0	6	0	0	0	73	1
Sunderland	2008–09	Premier League	16	0	2	0	0	0	0	0	18	0
Sunderland	2009–10	Premier League	25	0	1	0	2	0	0	0	28	0
Sunderland	Total		41	0	3	0	2	0	0	0	46	0
Leeds United (loan)	2010–11	Championship	32	0	0	0	0	0	0	0	32	0
West Ham United (loan)	2011–12	Championship	38	1	1	0	1	0	3	0	43	1
West Ham United	2012–13	Premier League	12	0	0	0	1	0	0	0	13	0
West Ham United	2013–14	Premier League	22	0	0	0	4	0	0	0	26	0
West Ham United	Total		34	0	0	0	5	0	0	0	39	0
Ballynahinch United	2023–24	NAFL Division 1C	2	0	0	0	0	0	1	0	3	0
Career total			342	2	21	0	22	0	5	0	391	2

=== International ===
Northern Ireland
Year	Apps	Goals
2001	2	1
2002	6	0
2003	7	0
2004	3	0
2005	2	0
2007	4	0
2008	5	0
2009	4	0
2010	1	0
Total	34	1

== Honours ==
Sunderland

- Football League Championship: 2004–05

West Ham United

- Football League Championship play-offs: 2012

Individual

- PFA Team of the Year: 2004–05 Football League Championship
- Sunderland Player of the Season: 2004–05
- West Ham United Player's Player of the Season: 2011–12
