= Ben Alnwick =

English footballer (born 1987)

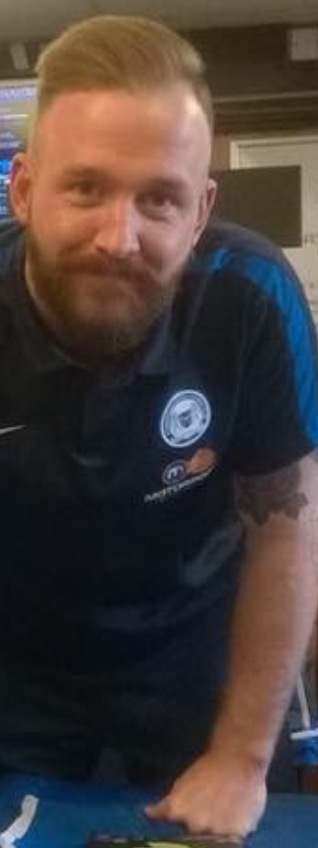
- Alnwick at a Peterborough United signing

Personal information
- Full name: Benjamin Robert Alnwick
- Date of birth: 1 January 1987 (age 39)
- Place of birth: Prudhoe, England
- Height: 6 ft 2 in (1.88 m)
- Position: Goalkeeper

Youth career
- –2004: Sunderland

Senior career*
Years	Team	Apps	(Gls)
2004–2007	Sunderland	19	(0)
2007–2012	Tottenham Hotspur	1	(0)
2007	→ Luton Town (loan)	4	(0)
2008	→ Leicester City (loan)	8	(0)
2008	→ Carlisle United (loan)	6	(0)
2009	→ Norwich City (loan)	3	(0)
2010	→ Leeds United (loan)	0	(0)
2010	→ Doncaster Rovers (loan)	0	(0)
2011	→ Leyton Orient (loan)	6	(0)
2012–2013	Barnsley	10	(0)
2013–2014	Charlton Athletic	10	(0)
2014	Leyton Orient	1	(0)
2014–2016	Peterborough United	84	(0)
2016–2019	Bolton Wanderers	87	(0)
Total		239	(0)

International career
2002–2003	England U16	9	(0)
2004	England U17	5	(0)
2004–2005	England U18	2	(0)
2005	England U19	2	(0)
2007	England U21	2	(0)
- * Club domestic league appearances and goals as of 21:02, 12 August 2019 (UTC)

Benjamin Robert Alnwick (born 1 January 1987) is an English former professional footballer who played as a goalkeeper.

Alnwick started his career at Sunderland in 2004, having progressed through the club's youth ranks, but never fully established himself in the first team. He left for Tottenham Hotspur in January 2007, having made 19 league appearances, but never made more than a single league appearance for Tottenham. Instead, he spent several loan spells away from the club, at Luton Town, Leicester City, Carlisle United, Norwich City, Leeds United, Doncaster Rovers and Leyton Orient. He switched permanently to Barnsley in July 2012, and made 12 appearances, but was deemed surplus to requirements in September 2013, and his contract was terminated by mutual consent.

Alnwick has represented England at under-16, under-17, under-18, under-19 and under-21 levels.

== Club career ==
=== Sunderland ===
Alnwick was born in the small Northumberland town of Prudhoe. He spent his boyhood years playing for the Prudhoe youth side. He started his professional career at Sunderland, and came to prominence at the climax of their 2004–05 Football League Championship-winning season, replacing the injured Thomas Myhre for Sunderland's last three games. His performances against Leicester City and West Ham United, the games that won Sunderland promotion to the Premier League and Championship win respectively, were impressive. In November 2005, he spent a stint as the number one goalkeeper at Sunderland, replacing Kelvin Davis. Despite impressing, particularly in Sunderland's 3–2 defeat to Tottenham Hotspur where he made a penalty save from Robbie Keane, Alnwick was dropped in favour of Kelvin Davis. After the departure of Davis to Southampton, Alnwick was given the number 1 shirt for the 2006–07 season.

After a disappointing start to the season 2006–07 season, Alnwick was relegated to the substitutes bench in favour of Darren Ward by new boss Roy Keane.

=== Tottenham Hotspur ===
Just two days after the January 2007 transfer window had opened, Alnwick joined Tottenham Hotspur for a fee of £900,000 in a deal that could rise to £1.3 million and saw Márton Fülöp going the other way for £500,000.

==== Loan moves ====
In September 2007 he was loaned to League One side Luton Town on a three-month loan deal. He was recalled from Luton in October, due to an injury to Paul Robinson. However, on 7 January 2008, Alnwick joined Leicester City on loan until the end of the season.

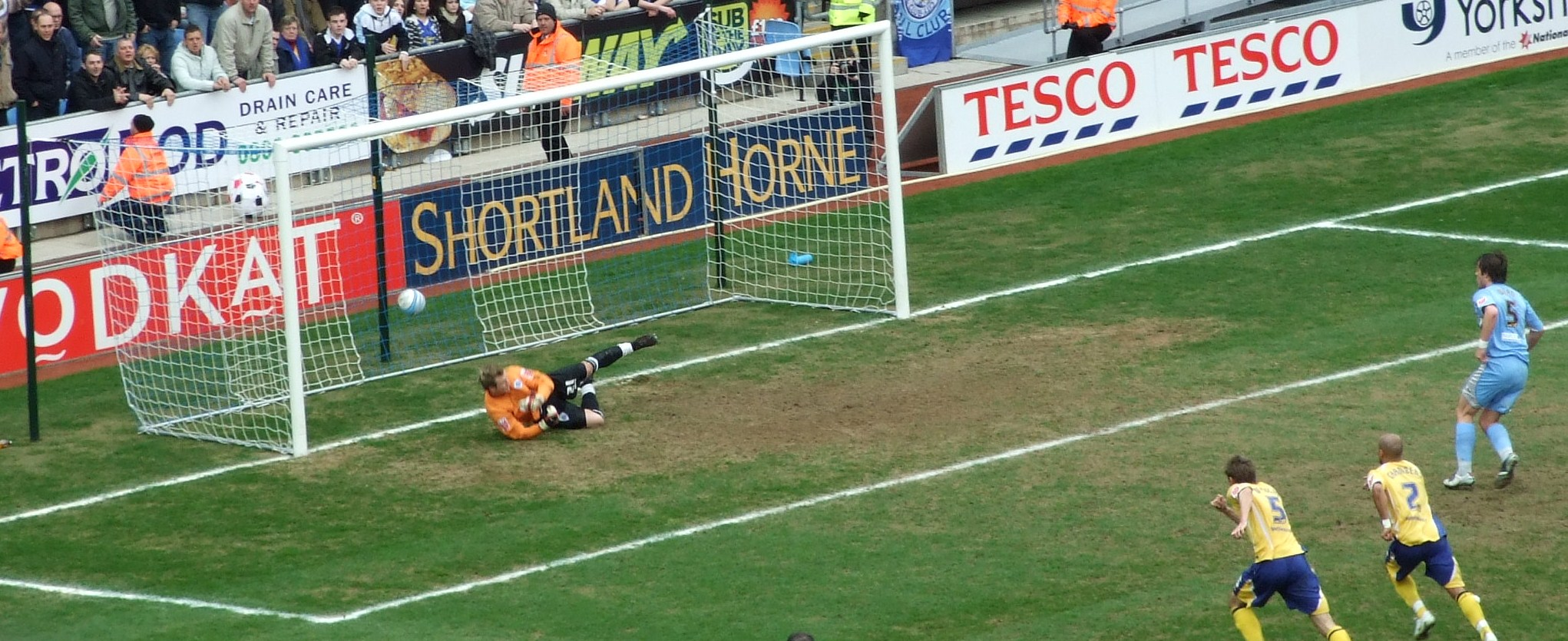
Alnwick fails to save a penalty kick in an M69 derby at the Ricoh Arena

Alnwick made his league debut in an M69 Derby on 12 January, keeping a clean sheet as Leicester won 2–0 at the Walkers Stadium. He kept four clean sheets in eight league games, conceding six goals before suffering a thigh injury as Leicester were relegated from the Championship.

On 16 October 2008, Alnwick joined League One side Carlisle United on an initial one-month loan deal and was recalled by Tottenham after the one-month loan ended to become another serious option for the first team goal-keeper position.

==== Return to Tottenham Hotspur ====
Alnwick made his debut for Tottenham in a League Cup semi-final second leg against Burnley, which ended in a 3–2 loss, although Tottenham won 6–4 on aggregate.

==== Loan to Norwich City ====
In July 2009, he signed on loan at Norwich City for three months. Alnwick made his debut in the 4–0 win over Yeovil Town and kept a clean sheet. He returned to Tottenham on 5 September after picking up a hip injury that was expected to keep him out for six weeks.

==== Return to Tottenham ====
His first Premier League game for Tottenham was at Burnley on the final day of the 2009–10 season, 9 May; he conceded four goals as Burnley won 4–2.

==== More loan moves ====
On 14 October 2010, Alnwick joined Leeds United on loan for 28 days. Alnwick was named on the bench against Middlesbrough and Leicester City.

Alnwick moved to Doncaster Rovers on 4 March 2011 and stayed until 9 April 2011 after their goalkeeper Neil Sullivan became injured. He was an unused sub in games against Leeds United and Coventry City. Later in the year, he made eight appearances on loan for Leyton Orient.

=== Barnsley ===
On 4 July 2012, Alnwick moved to Barnsley on a two-year contract. Alnwick made his Barnsley début on 11 August 2012 in a League Cup tie away at Rochdale. With Barnsley leading 2–1 at 90 mins Alnwick conceded a penalty and was sent off. The penalty was subsequently scored moving the game into extra game. however Barnsley went on to win regardless. On 28 August 2012, he returned to action in the following league cup tie in a 3–1 away defeat to Swansea. Alnwick played his first Championship match of the season in a 1–0 victory over Bristol City on 1 September 2012. However, after the signings of Mike Pollitt and Christian Dibble, Alnwick's contract was terminated by mutual consent on 2 September 2013.

=== Charlton Athletic ===
On 4 September 2013, Alnwick signed a one-year contract for Charlton Athletic. He made his debut in a game against Doncaster Rovers after Ben Hamer was injured during the warm up. He managed to keep a clean sheet in a game that Charlton won 2–0.

=== Leyton Orient ===
On 31 January 2014, Alnwick joined Leyton Orient. However, a week later, it was announced that Alnwick was suffering from unspecified medical problems, and was unable to train or play. On 24 March 2014, Alnwick left Leyton Orient by mutual consent after having his contract cancelled.

=== Peterborough United ===
On 25 July 2014, Alnwick signed a three-year deal at Peterborough United.

On 29 August 2016, Peterborough United placed Alnwick on the transfer list. The 29-year-old informed manager Grant McCann that he wished to go on the list for personal reasons. Two days later, club chairman Darragh MacAnthony announced that the club had accepted Alnwick's request for his contract to be cancelled.

=== Bolton Wanderers ===
On the same day he left Peterborough, it was confirmed that Alnwick had moved to fellow Football League One side Bolton Wanderers on a free transfer to offer competition for Mark Howard. At the end of the 2017–18 season it was announced that Alnwick had been named the Bolton Wanderers Player of the Year by the club's supporters. Having played no games for Bolton for the first half of the 2019–20 season, Alnwick decided in December to mutually agree with the club to terminate his contract with immediate effect. Alnwick hadn't been available for selection during Keith Hill's reign.

== International career ==
Alnwick received his first call-up to the England under-21 squad ahead of 15 August 2006 match against Moldova. Still awaiting his debut, Alnwick was named in Stuart Pearce's first squad as England under-21 coach, alongside another uncapped goalkeeper, Joe Hart. He was not chosen to start the match, on 6 February 2007, against Spain.

Alnwick was named in the first England U21 squad to play at the new Wembley against Italy U21s on 24 March 2007, but he remained an unused sub. He was also named in England's squad for the U21 European Championships in the Netherlands. He debuted a year after his first call-up, in a friendly against Romania at Ashton Gate. He came on for the second half as a substitute for Joe Hart, and kept a clean sheet.

== Personal life ==
His younger brother Jak, a goalkeeper for Huddersfield Town, was at the Prudhoe local youth clubs and the Sunderland youth academy but joined North East rivals Newcastle United as a first year scholar in 2008. Jak won Newcastle's "Wor Jackie" award (named after Jackie Milburn) for best under-18 player in 2011. The pair played against each other in a 1–1 draw between Port Vale and Peterborough United on 17 October 2015.

Alnwick has been in an on-off relationship with his childhood sweetheart since 2007.

== Career statistics ==
Appearances and goals by club, season and competition
Club	Season	League			FA Cup		League Cup		Other		Total	
Club	Season	Division	Apps	Goals	Apps	Goals	Apps	Goals	Apps	Goals	Apps	Goals
Sunderland	2004–05	Championship	3	0	0	0	0	0	0	0	3	0
Sunderland	2005–06	Premier League	5	0	0	0	2	0	0	0	7	0
Sunderland	2006–07	Championship	11	0	0	0	1	0	0	0	12	0
Sunderland	Total		19	0	0	0	3	0	0	0	22	0
Tottenham Hotspur	2007–08	Premier League	0	0	0	0	0	0	0	0	0	0
Tottenham Hotspur	2008–09	Premier League	0	0	1	0	1	0	0	0	2	0
Tottenham Hotspur	2009–10	Premier League	1	0	0	0	0	0	0	0	1	0
Tottenham Hotspur	2010–11	Premier League	0	0	0	0	0	0	0	0	0	0
Tottenham Hotspur	2011–12	Premier League	0	0	0	0	0	0	0	0	0	0
Tottenham Hotspur	Total		1	0	1	0	1	0	0	0	3	0
Luton Town (loan)	2007–08	League One	4	0	0	0	0	0	0	0	4	0
Leicester City (loan)	2007–08	Championship	8	0	0	0	0	0	0	0	8	0
Carlisle United (loan)	2008–09	League One	6	0	0	0	0	0	0	0	6	0
Norwich City (loan)	2009–10	League One	3	0	0	0	2	0	1	0	6	0
Leyton Orient (loan)	2011–12	League One	6	0	2	0	0	0	0	0	8	0
Barnsley	2012–13	Championship	10	0	0	0	2	0	0	0	12	0
Charlton Athletic	2013–14	Championship	10	0	2	0	0	0	0	0	12	0
Leyton Orient	2013–14	League One	1	0	0	0	0	0	0	0	1	0
Peterborough United	2014–15	League One	41	0	2	0	1	0	1	0	45	0
Peterborough United	2015–16	League One	39	0	5	0	2	0	1	0	47	0
Peterborough United	2016–17	League One	4	0	0	0	1	0	0	0	5	0
Peterborough United	Total		84	0	7	0	4	0	2	0	97	0
Bolton Wanderers	2016–17	League One	21	0	3	0	0	0	2	0	26	0
Bolton Wanderers	2017–18	Championship	39	0	0	0	2	0	0	0	41	0
Bolton Wanderers	2018–19	Championship	27	0	1	0	0	0	0	0	28	0
Bolton Wanderers	2019–20	League One	0	0	0	0	0	0	0	0	0	0
Bolton Wanderers	Total		87	0	4	0	2	0	2	0	95	0
Career total			239	0	16	0	14	0	5	0	274	0

== Honours ==
Tottenham Hotspur

- Football League Cup runner-up: 2008–09

Bolton Wanderers

- EFL League One runner-up: 2016–17
