= Euan McLean =

Scottish footballer

Personal information
- Date of birth: 9 January 1986 (age 40)
- Place of birth: Kilmarnock, Scotland
- Position: Goalkeeper

Youth career
- –2002: Kilmarnock

Senior career*
Years	Team	Apps	(Gls)
2002–2004	Sunderland	0	(0)
2004–2008	Dundee United	7	(0)
2008–2010	St Johnstone	4	(0)
2010	→ Forfar Athletic (loan)	6	(0)
2010–2011	Forfar Athletic	3	(0)

International career^{‡}
2007–2008	Scotland U21	2	(0)
- * Club domestic league appearances and goals as of 16 August 2011 ‡ National team caps and goals as of 29 October 2006

Euan McLean (born 9 January 1986) is a Scottish footballer who played as a goalkeeper. He played for Sunderland, Dundee United, St Johnstone and Forfar Athletic and made two appearances for the Scotland under-21 team.

== Career ==
Having been a youth signing with hometown club Kilmarnock, McLean began his professional career when he moved south to join Sunderland in July 2002. The nearest he came to playing in the Sunderland first team was on the last day of the 2003–04 season when he was an unused substitute at Burnley. At the start of the following season he was still with Sunderland and had been allocated a squad number, but having slipped down to fifth choice goalkeeper he was released shortly after the season began.

McLean signed for Dundee United in September 2004 and was initially third choice goalkeeper at the club. By the beginning of the 2006–07 season, he was installed as the regular backup to Derek Stillie, and had been named on the bench for United on numerous occasions. He was given his senior debut by manager Craig Brewster in October 2006, along with several youngsters, in an away SPL match at Falkirk. It proved to be a difficult debut for McLean as Dundee United suffered a 5–1 defeat with manager Brewster sacked the following day; McLean not featuring again that season.

McLean made seven first-team appearances in the 2007–08 season and was an unused substitute in United's League Cup Final penalty shootout defeat but was told in April 2008 that he was free to leave Tannadice at the end of the season. He joined St Johnstone in May 2008 as backup to first-choice goalkeeper Alan Main, playing in a handful of league matches during his first season at McDiarmid Park.

As the emergency loan transfer window shut in Scotland, McLean signed with Forfar Athletic for the rest of the season. He was released by St Johnstone at the end of the 2009/10 season and joined Forfar on a permanent basis. McLean retired from professional football in March 2011 after being accepted to become a police officer.

== Career statistics ==
Seasons with appearances only

Club	Season	League		Cup		Lg Cup		Other		Total	
Club	Season	Apps	Goals	Apps	Goals	Apps	Goals	Apps	Goals	Apps	Goals
Dundee United	2006–07	1	0	0	0	0	0	0	0	1	0
Dundee United	2007–08	6	0	1	0	0	0	0	0	7	0
Dundee United	Total	7	0	1	0	0	0	0	0	8	0
St Johnstone	2008–09	3	0	0	0	1	0	0	0	4	0
St Johnstone	Total	3	0	0	0	1	0	0	0	4	0
Career total		10	0	1	0	1	0	0	0	12	0

== Honours ==
=== Dundee United ===
- Scottish League Cup Runner-up: 1

2007–08
