= Stephen Elliott (footballer) =

Irish footballer (born 1984)

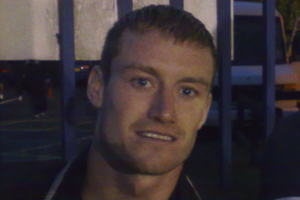
- Elliott in 2008

Personal information
- Full name: Stephen William Elliott
- Date of birth: 6 January 1984 (age 42)
- Place of birth: Dublin, Ireland
- Positions: Forward; attacking midfielder

Team information
- Current team: Wexford (manager)

Youth career
- Belvedere
- Stella Maris
- Manchester City

Senior career*
| Years | Team | Apps | (Gls) |
| 2003–2004 | Manchester City | 2 | (0) |
| 2004–2007 | Sunderland | 81 | (22) |
| 2007–2008 | Wolverhampton Wanderers | 29 | (5) |
| 2008–2010 | Preston North End | 46 | (8) |
| 2010 | → Norwich City (loan) | 10 | (2) |
| 2010–2012 | Heart of Midlothian | 56 | (11) |
| 2012–2013 | Coventry City | 18 | (5) |
| 2014–2015 | Carlisle United | 15 | (1) |
| 2016 | Shelbourne | 6 | (0) |
| 2017 | Drogheda United | 19 | (2) |
| 2017–2018 | Morpeth Town | 21 | (6) |
| Total | | 303 | (62) |

International career
- Republic of Ireland U17
| 2002–2003 | Republic of Ireland U19 | 9 | (4) |
| 2003 | Republic of Ireland U20 | 4 | (3) |
| 2003–2004 | Republic of Ireland U21 | 10 | (6) |
| 2004–2006 | Republic of Ireland | 9 | (1) |

Managerial career
- 2024–: Wexford
- * Club domestic league appearances and goals

Stephen William Elliott (born 6 January 1984) is an Irish football manager. He is currently the manager of League of Ireland First Division club Wexford. During his playing career he played for Manchester City, Sunderland, Wolves, Preston North End, Heart of Midlothian, Coventry City, Carlisle United, Shelbourne, Drogheda United and Morpeth Town, and also had a loan spell at Norwich City.

He represented the Republic of Ireland, scoring an important winner in a World Cup qualifier away to Cyprus in 2005.

== Club career ==
Elliott began his career as a youth player with Belvedere. and Stella Maris.

=== Manchester City ===
Elliott began his professional career as a youth player at Manchester City after impressing in a trial match with Stella Maris in which he scored five goals in the space of half an hour. His league debut came on 21 February 2004 when Kevin Keegan used him as a late substitute in a 3–1 win at Bolton Wanderers. He failed to establish himself in the first team, making only one further appearances as a substitute, with his development at City hampered by a serious back injury that ruled him out for a season.

=== Sunderland ===
Sunderland manager Mick McCarthy signed him from Manchester City on 1 June 2004 for an initial fee of £125,000, set by a tribunal, with well over £250,000 of additional payments linked to his subsequent performance at the Black Cats of around £100,000 if Sunderland were promoted to the Premier League; £50,000 if he played in a competitive game for the Republic of Ireland; five instalments of £20,000 for each set of ten appearances he made for Sunderland up to a maximum of 50 games; and 25% of any sell-on transfer fees. McCarthy later admitted that he had bought him outrageously cheaply, although that was before all of the above add-ons were ultimately realised. He made his debut on 7 August against Coventry in their 2–0 defeat, with his first goal for the club coming on 10 August against Crewe Alexandra, scoring the winner in their 3–1 win. He quickly established himself as first-team regular, making 47 appearances scoring 16 goals in his debut season as the team finished as champions in 2005, helping him win the clubs young player of the season award. And in July 2005 he signed a contract extension extending his stay until 2008.

However, his first Premiership season was largely disrupted by injury, only managing 15 appearances although prior to his injuries he scored two long-range goals against Manchester United and Newcastle United.

On Sunderland's return to the Championship the following season, he showed good form when fit, but again was disrupted by an ankle injury which kept him out for two months. In all he made 88 appearances for Sunderland scoring 23 goals.

=== Wolverhampton Wanderers ===
Elliott moved to Wolves in July 2007 for an undisclosed fee signing a three-year contract, linking up with Mick McCarthy, his former manager at Sunderland. He made his debut on 11 August 2007 in their 2–1 defeat to Watford, going on to score his first goal for the club on 15 September scoring the opening goal against Sheffield United. However, he failed to make a strong impact at Molineux, and was transfer-listed at the season's end after the club missed out on the play-offs on goal difference.

He made one more appearance for Wolves the following season in the League Cup against Rotherham. In all he made 32 appearances for Wolves scoring six times.

=== Preston North End ===
On 1 September 2008, Elliot signed for Championship side Preston North End on a three-year deal for an undisclosed fee. He made his debut as a substitute on 16 September against Nottingham Forest, and scored his first goal for the club on 18 October 2008 against Reading, with the winning goal in their 2–1 win. He scored a brace against his former team Wolves at Molineux in their 3–1 win in January. He was to form a partnership with Jon Parkin in Preston's attack. In his debut season he made 39 appearances scoring six times.

The following season he made 13 appearances scoring twice before falling out of favour and in March 2010 he joined Norwich on loan. On his return on 7 August he negotiated an early release from his Preston contract.

==== Norwich City ====
On 6 March 2010, Elliot signed on an emergency loan deal with Norwich City until the end of the season and was given the number 11 shirt. He made his debut on 6 March 2010 against Yeovil in League One, scoring his first goals for the club the following week, scoring a brace against Huddersfield in their 3–1 win. In all he made ten appearances scoring twice.

=== Heart of Midlothian ===
On 9 August 2010 Elliott joined Scottish Premier League side Heart of Midlothian on a two-year deal, reuniting him with former strike partner at Sunderland Kevin Kyle. He made his debut as a 66th-minute substitute on 14 August against St Johnstone at Tynecastle, going on to make his first start on 7 November against rivals Hibernian in the first Edinburgh Derby of the season scoring the second goal in a 2–0 victory for Hearts. He scored his first home goal for the club on 10 December to make the score 3–0 in a 5–0 victory against Aberdeen. Despite a hamstring injury that put him out for a month, he made 31 appearances scoring eight goals in his debut season.

Elliott become renowned for his crucial goals away from home. Of his eight goals for Hearts in his debut season, seven came away from home including doubles at Hamilton in a 2–0 win, and at Kilmarnock in a 2–1 victory, the latter coming after Elliott had come off the substitutes bench for the second half to reverse a 1–0 deficit. Elliott scored an equalising goal in the 83rd minute of the third Edinburgh derby of the season, earning Hearts a 2–2 draw despite having played for over an hour with ten men.

He made his European debut on 28 July 2011 in a Europa League qualifier against Paksi. Elliott helped Hearts win the 2011–12 Scottish Cup; he started in the 2012 Scottish Cup Final, which Hearts won 5–1 against Hibernian. Days later, Hearts announced that Elliott's contract would not be renewed due to financial problems within the club.

=== Coventry City ===
On 2 July 2012, Elliott joined Football League One side Coventry City on a one-year deal after his Heart of Midlothian contract had expired. He scored three goals up to the new year, against Sheffield United and scored two against MK Dons at Stadium MK which Coventry won 3–2 after going behind. Coventry manager Steven Pressley announced on 30 April 2013 that Elliott's contract would not be renewed having picked up a serious knee injury.

=== Carlisle United ===
On 7 August 2014, Elliott signed a one-year deal with recently relegated Football League Two side Carlisle United.

=== Return to Ireland ===
In April 2016, Elliott trained with League of Ireland Premier Division club Shamrock Rovers before signing for Dublin First Division side Shelbourne. On 11 August 2016, Shelbourne announced Stephen had left by mutual consent. Elliott signed for newly promoted Premier Division side Drogheda United for the 2017 season but he really struggled to find any long term fitness due to injuries and he could not help them from finishing bottom of the league and being relegated.

=== Morpeth Town ===
Elliott signed for Northern League Division One outfit Morpeth Town in November 2017. He retired at the end of the season.

== International career ==
Elliott has represented Ireland at U-17 level, U-19, the U-20 team at the 2003 FIFA World Youth Championship, where he was their top goalscorer, and the U-21 team where he made 10 appearances scoring six times.

Elliott's good start for Sunderland in 2004 led to a call-up to the Republic of Ireland senior squad, and he made his international debut against Croatia at Lansdowne Road on 16 November 2004. He scored his first senior International goal to beat Cyprus 1–0 in a World Cup qualifier on 8 October 2005. In all he made nine appearances for Ireland at full international level.

== Post Playing Career ==
After retiring as a player, Elliott spent time working in the media as a football analyst for various outlets. He spent time as Head of academy at Darlington, before he moved on to become Lead Coach of the Under-15 and Under-16 sides at Fleetwood Town. On 31 January 2024, Elliott was announced as Head of Academy Football at St Patrick's Athletic and also head coach of the club's Under-20 side.

On 26 November 2024, Elliott was named as manager of League of Ireland First Division club Wexford.

During his first season as Wexford manager, he placed a strong emphasis on youth development and the integration of academy talent into the senior setup. He handed out sixteen senior debuts, including fifteen in the League of Ireland, eight of whom came through the Wexford academy. His approach was noted for providing opportunities to young players and strengthening the pathway between the club's academy and first team.

== Personal life ==
Elliott was born in the North Inner City Dublin area in the Republic of Ireland. He is often known by the nickname of Sleeves, which he picked up whilst playing for Sunderland from a phrase "Sleeves Up" which he often used. He married his long-term partner, Alexa, in 2009, and they now reside on the Fylde Coast with their family.

== Career statistics ==
Appearances and goals by club, season and competition
| Club | Season | League | | | National Cup | | League Cup | | Other (Note: Appearances in 2008–09 Play-offs, 2011–12 UEFA Europa League, Football League Trophy and Leinster Senior Cup) | | Total | |
| Club | Season | Division | Apps | Goals | Apps | Goals | Apps | Goals | Apps | Goals | Apps | Goals |
|---|---|---|---|---|---|---|---|---|---|---|---|---|
| Manchester City | 2003–04 | Premier League | 2 | 0 | 0 | 0 | 0 | 0 | 0 | 0 | 2 | 0 |
| Sunderland | 2004–05 | Championship | 42 | 15 | 2 | 0 | 2 | 1 | 0 | 0 | 46 | 16 |
| Sunderland | 2005–06 | Premier League | 15 | 2 | 0 | 0 | 1 | 0 | 0 | 0 | 16 | 2 |
| Sunderland | 2006–07 | Championship | 24 | 5 | 1 | 0 | 1 | 0 | 0 | 0 | 26 | 5 |
| Sunderland | Total | | 81 | 22 | 3 | 0 | 4 | 1 | 0 | 0 | 88 | 23 |
| Wolverhampton Wanderers | 2007–08 | Championship | 29 | 4 | 2 | 1 | 0 | 0 | 0 | 0 | 31 | 5 |
| Wolverhampton Wanderers | 2008–09 | Championship | 0 | 0 | 0 | 0 | 1 | 0 | 0 | 0 | 1 | 0 |
| Wolverhampton Wanderers | Total | | 29 | 4 | 2 | 1 | 1 | 0 | 0 | 0 | 32 | 6 |
| Preston North End | 2008–09 | Championship | 37 | 6 | 1 | 0 | 0 | 0 | 1 | 0 | 39 | 6 |
| Preston North End | 2009–10 | Championship | 9 | 1 | 1 | 0 | 3 | 1 | 0 | 0 | 13 | 2 |
| Preston North End | Total | | 46 | 7 | 2 | 0 | 3 | 1 | 1 | 0 | 52 | 9 |
| Norwich City (loan) | 2009–10 | League One | 10 | 2 | 0 | 0 | 0 | 0 | 0 | 0 | 10 | 2 |
| Heart of Midlothian | 2010–11 | Scottish Premier League | 30 | 8 | 1 | 0 | 0 | 0 | 0 | 0 | 31 | 8 |
| Heart of Midlothian | 2011–12 | Scottish Premier League | 26 | 3 | 5 | 0 | 0 | 0 | 3 | 0 | 34 | 3 |
| Heart of Midlothian | Total | | 56 | 11 | 6 | 0 | 0 | 0 | 3 | 0 | 65 | 11 |
| Coventry City | 2012–13 | League One | 18 | 5 | 0 | 0 | 3 | 0 | 4 | 0 | 25 | 5 |
| Carlisle United | 2014–15 | League Two | 15 | 1 | 0 | 0 | 1 | 0 | 2 | 0 | 18 | 1 |
| Shelbourne | 2016 | League of Ireland First Division | 6 | 0 | 0 | 0 | 1 | 0 | 0 | 0 | 7 | 0 |
| Drogheda United | 2017 | League of Ireland Premier Division | 19 | 2 | 0 | 0 | 1 | 0 | 1 | 0 | 21 | 2 |
| Morpeth Town | 2017–18 | Northern Football League Division One | 21 | 6 | 0 | 0 | 0 | 0 | 0 | 0 | 21 | 6 |
| Career total | | | 303 | 58 | 13 | 1 | 14 | 2 | 11 | 0 | 341 | 65 |

== Honours ==
Sunderland

- Football League Championship: 2004–05, 2006–07

Norwich City

- Football League One: 2009–10

Heart of Midlothian

- Scottish Cup: 2011–12

Individual

- FAI Young International Player of the Year: 2005
