= 1999–2000 Carlisle United F.C. season =

Carlisle United
1999–2000 season
- Chairman: Michael Knighton
- Manager: Martin Wilkinson
- Stadium: Brunton Park
- Football League Third Division: 23rd
- FA Cup: First round
- League Cup: First round
- Football League Trophy: Semi final
- Top goalscorer: Steve Soley (9)

During the 1999–2000 English football season, Carlisle United Football Club competed in the Football League Third Division where they finished in 23rd position narrowly avoiding relegation to the Football Conference by goal difference.

== Season summary ==
Manager Nigel Pearson was sacked shortly after the end of the previous season, with chairman Michael Knighton publicly blaming the previous season's relegation battle on the 35-year-old's inexperience, and replacing him with Martin Wilkinson; an experienced coach, but one whose managerial experience only consisted of a short spell in charge of Peterborough United over a decade prior.

The change initially seemed to work well and produced a promising start to the season, only for this to be followed by a dismal run of just two wins in twenty-six attempts, plunging them straight into yet another fight against relegation. For the second season in a row, relegation to the Conference was avoided on the final day; while Carlisle lost their last game, Chester City also lost theirs, allowing Carlisle to survive by virtue of two goals. Ultimately, Carlisle's taking maximum points from their two fixtures over Chester would prove key to their survival; had they taken anything less than all six points from those two matches, Chester would have stayed in the Football League at their expense.

== Final league table ==
Pos	Team	Pld	W	D	L	GF	GA	GD	Pts	Promotion or relegation
20	York City	46	12	16	18	39	53	−14	52	
21	Exeter City	46	11	11	24	46	72	−26	44	
22	Shrewsbury Town	46	9	13	24	40	67	−27	40	
23	Carlisle United	46	9	12	25	42	75	−33	39	
24	Chester City (R)	46	10	9	27	44	79	−35	39	Relegation to Football Conference

Rules for classification: 1) Points; 2) Goal difference; 3) Goals scored
(R) Relegated

== Results ==
Carlisle United's score comes first

=== Legend ===
Win	Draw	Loss

=== Football League Division Three ===
Match	Date	Opponent	Venue	Result	Attendance	Scorers
1	7 August 1999	Leyton Orient	H	2–1	3,895	Tracey 21', Soley 69'
2	14 August 1999	Swansea City	A	0–1	5,452	
3	21 August 1999	Hartlepool United	H	0–3	4,033	
4	28 August 1999	Mansfield Town	A	1–1	2,138	Baker 37'
5	30 August 1999	Plymouth Argyle	H	4–2	2,863	Tracey 41', 75', Black 44', Baker 47'
6	4 September 1999	Northampton Town	A	0–0	4,864	
7	11 September 1999	Lincoln City	H	1–0	3,254	Tracey 59'
8	18 September 1999	Shrewsbury Town	A	1–4	2,393	Soley 45'
9	25 September 1999	Halifax Town	A	2–5	2,545	Tracey 10', Gregory 76'
10	2 October 1999	Southend United	H	1–1	2,800	Clark 20'
11	9 October 1999	Brighton & Hove Albion	H	0–1	3,059	
12	16 October 1999	Exeter City	A	1–1	3,012	Dobie 85'
13	19 October 1999	Darlington	A	1–3	5,016	Harries 77'
14	23 October 1999	Halifax Town	H	1–1	2,593	Dobie 55'
15	2 November 1999	York City	H	0–1	2,512	
16	6 November 1999	Cheltenham Town	A	1–3	3,118	Dobie 18'
17	12 November 1999	Peterborough United	H	1–1	2,515	Dobie 8'
18	23 November 1999	Barnet	A	0–3	1,769	
19	27 November 1999	Rotherham United	H	0–1	2,649	
20	4 December 1999	Leyton Orient	A	1–0	3,871	Pitts 83'
21	14 December 1999	Torquay United	H	0–0	2,028	
22	18 December 1999	Hull City	A	1–2	4,727	Tracey 90'
23	26 December 1999	Rochdale	H	1–2	3,812	Durnin 16'
24	28 December 1999	Macclesfield Town	A	1–2	2,836	Tracey 62'
25	3 January 2000	Chester City	H	4–1	4,565	Dobie 2', 51', Harries 71', Prokas 90'
26	8 January 2000	Torquay United	A	1–4	2,112	Soley 49'
27	22 January 2000	Hartlepool United	A	0–1	3,530	
28	29 January 2000	Mansfield Town	H	0–2	2,501	
29	5 February 2000	Plymouth Argyle	A	0–2	4,009	
30	19 February 2000	Rotherham United	A	2–4	4,271	Halliday 43', Soley 69'
31	26 February 2000	Shrewsbury Town	H	1–1	3,105	Halliday 46'
32	4 March 2000	Lincoln City	A	0–5	2,945	
33	11 March 2000	York City	A	1–1	2,979	Halliday 60'
34	18 March 2000	Barnet	H	3–1	2,606	Soley 29', Halliday 42', 51'
35	21 March 2000	Peterborough United	A	2–0	5,178	Durnin 38', 62'
36	25 March 2000	Rochdale	A	2–3	2,417	Soley 14', 71' (2 pen)
37	28 March 2000	Swansea City	H	2–0	2,748	Searle 37', Halliday 59'
38	1 April 2000	Hull City	H	0–4	3,495	
39	4 April 2000	Cheltenham Town	H	1–1	2,388	Soley 89'
40	8 April 2000	Chester City	A	1–0	5,507	Dobie 90'
41	11 April 2000	Northampton Town	H	0–1	2,855	
42	15 April 2000	Macclesfield Town	H	0–1	3,047	
43	22 April 2000	Exeter City	H	0–0	3,567	
44	24 April 2000	Southend United	A	0–2	3,053	
45	29 April 2000	Darlington	H	1–1	6,525	Halliday 38'
46	6 May 2000	Brighton & Hove Albion	A	0–1	5,998	

=== League Cup ===
Round	Date	Opponent	Venue	Result	Attendance	Scorers
R1 1st Leg	10 August 1999	Grimsby Town	H	0–0	3,000	
R1 2nd Leg	21 August 1999	Grimsby Town	A	0–6	2,696	

=== FA Cup ===
Round	Date	Opponent	Venue	Result	Attendance	Scorers
R1	30 October 1999	Ilkeston Town	A	1–2	1,321	Harries 18'

=== Football League Trophy ===
Round	Date	Opponent	Venue	Result	Attendance	Scorers
R2	25 January 2000	Wigan Athletic	H	2–1	1,748	Pitts 32', Soley 39'
Quarter final	22 February 2000	Hartlepool United	A	2–1	2,399	Halliday 13', McKinnon 51'
Semi final	7 March 2000	Rochdale	H	0–1	1,792	

== Squad ==
Appearances for competitive matches only

Pos.	Name	League		FA Cup		League Cup		Football League Trophy		Total	
Pos.	Name	Apps	Goals	Apps	Goals	Apps	Goals	Apps	Goals	Apps	Goals
MF	(England) Graham Anthony	12(6)	0	1	0	0(2)	0	2	0	15(8)	0
FW	(England) Paul Baker	12(5)	2	0	0	0	0	0	0	12(5)	2
DF	(England) Billy Barr	28(1)	0	1	0	1(1)	0	1	0	31(2)	0
MF	(England) Tommy Black	5	1	0	0	0	0	0	0	5	1
DF	(England) Rob Bowman	12(3)	0	1	0	0	0	0	0	13(3)	0
DF	(England) David Brightwell	37	0	1	0	2	0	2	0	42	0
DF	(England) Peter Clark	42(1)	1	1	0	2	0	1	0	46(1)	1
MF	(England) Adrian Clarke	7	0	0	0	0	0	0	0	7	0
MF	(England) Paul Dalton	3	0	0	0	0	0	0	0	3	0
GK	(Wales) Andy Dibble	2	0	0	0	0	0	0	0	2	0
FW	(England) Scott Dobie	25(9)	7	1	0	0	0	3	0	29(9)	7
MF	(England) John Durnin	20(2)	3	0	0	0	0	1	0	21(1)	3
MF	(England) Andrew Gregory	6(1)	1	0	0	0	0	0(1)	0	6(2)	1
FW	(England) Stephen Halliday	16	7	0	0	0	0	2	1	18	8
FW	(Australia) Paul Harries	6(14)	2	1	1	0	0	0(1)	0	7(15)	3
MF	(England) Tony Hopper	25(2)	0	0	0	2	0	1(1)	0	28(3)	0
MF	(England) John Hore	1	0	0	0	0	0	0	0	1	0
GK	(Northern Ireland) Michael Ingham	7	0	0	0	0	0	0	0	7	0
GK	(England) Peter Keen	6	0	0	0	0	0	0	0	6	0
DF	(Scotland) Rob McKinnon	8	0	0	0	0	0	2	1	10	1
DF	(England) Matthew Pitts	20(9)	1	0	0	2	0	2	1	24(9)	2
DF	(England) Richard Prokas	20(7)	1	1	0	2	0	1(1)	0	24(8)	1
DF	(England) Paul Reid	17(2)	0	0	0	0	0	3	0	20(2)	0
MF	(Scotland) Andy Roddie	1(1)	0	0	0	0	0	0	0	1(1)	0
MF	(Wales) Damon Searle	14(7)	1	0	0	2	0	3	0	19(7)	1
MF	(England) Gavin Skelton	1(6)	0	0	0	1	0	0	0	2(6)	0
FW	(England) Steve Skinner	0(2)	0	0	0	0	0	0	0	0(2)	0
MF	(England) Steve Soley	35(2)	8	1	0	0	0	3	1	39(2)	9
DF	(England) Shaun Teale	18	0	0	0	0	0	2	0	20	0
MF	(England) Jeff Thorpe	4(9)	0	0	0	0(2)	0	0	0	4(11)	0
FW	(England) Richard Tracey	25(11)	7	1	0	2	0	1(1)	0	29(12)	7
FW	(Scotland) Andy Walker	3	0	0	0	0	0	0	0	3	0
GK	(England) Luke Weaver	29	0	1	0	2	0	1	0	33	0
DF	(England) Stuart Whitehead	29	0	0	0	2	0	0	0	31	0
GK	(Netherlands) Peter van der Kwaak	2	0	0	0	0	0	2	0	4	0

== See also ==
- 1999–2000 in English football
