= 1999–2000 Sunderland A.F.C. season =

English football club season

Sunderland A.F.C.
1999–2000 season
- Chairman: Bob Murray
- Manager: Peter Reid
- Stadium: Stadium of Light
- FA Premier League: 7th
- FA Cup: Fourth round
- League Cup: Third round
- Top goalscorer: Kevin Phillips (30)
- Average home league attendance: 40,495
Home colours	Away colours

During the 1999–2000 season, Sunderland participated in the FA Premier League.

== Season summary ==
Sunderland's 1999–2000 season started at Stamford Bridge, where Chelsea beat them 4–0. However, in the return match later in the season Sunderland turned the tables on Chelsea, avenging their 4–0 defeat with a 4–1 win at the Stadium of Light. Sunderland also achieved a 2–1 victory over rivals Newcastle United at St. James' Park, a result which helped bring about the resignation of Newcastle's manager, Ruud Gullit. At the end of the season Sunderland finished seventh, with Kevin Phillips winning the European Golden Shoe in his first top-flight season, scoring 30 goals.

== Team kit and sponsors ==
This season was the first in which the club was sponsored by car dealership Reg Vardy, and the last in which ASICS made the club's kit.

== Results ==
Sunderland's score comes first

=== Legend ===
Win	Draw	Loss

=== FA Premier League ===
==== League table ====
Pos	Team	Pld	W	D	L	GF	GA	GD	Pts	Qualification or relegation
5	Chelsea	38	18	11	9	53	34	+19	65	Qualification for the UEFA Cup first round (Note: Chelsea qualified for the UEFA Cup as FA Cup winners.)
6	Aston Villa	38	15	13	10	46	35	+11	58	Qualification for the Intertoto Cup third round
7	Sunderland	38	16	10	12	57	56	+1	58	
8	Leicester City	38	16	7	15	55	55	0	55	Qualification for the UEFA Cup first round (Note: Leicester City qualified for the UEFA Cup as League Cup winners.)
9	West Ham United	38	15	10	13	52	53	−1	55	

Source: Premier League
Rules for classification: 1) points; 2) goal difference; 3) number of goals scored.

==== Results summary ====
Overall								Home						Away					
Pld	W	D	L	GF	GA	GD	Pts	W	D	L	GF	GA	GD	W	D	L	GF	GA	GD
38	16	10	12	57	56	+1	58	10	6	3	28	17	+11	6	4	9	29	39	−10

Source: 1999-2000 FA Premier League table

==== Results by round ====
Round	1	2	3	4	5	6	7	8	9	10	11	12	13	14	15	16	17	18	19	20	21	22	23	24	25	26	27	28	29	30	31	32	33	34	35	36	37	38
Ground	A	H	H	A	A	H	H	A	H	A	H	A	H	A	H	A	H	H	A	H	A	A	H	H	A	H	A	A	H	H	A	H	A	A	H	A	H	A
Result	L	W	D	L	W	D	W	W	W	W	W	D	W	D	L	W	W	W	L	D	L	L	L	D	L	D	L	D	D	W	W	W	L	W	L	D	W	L
Position	20	11	11	16	11	11	8	4	4	2	3	3	3	3	4	3	4	3	3	4	4	5	5	6	6	6	7	9	8	7	6	6	7	7	7	7	7	7

Source: 11v11.com: 1999-2000 Sunderland results
A = Away; H = Home; W = Win; D = Draw; L = Loss

Date	Opponent	Venue	Result	Attendance	Scorers
7 August 1999	Chelsea	A	0–4	34,831	
10 August 1999	Watford	H	2–0	40,630	Phillips (2, 1 pen)
14 August 1999	Arsenal	H	0–0	41,680	
21 August 1999	Leeds United	A	1–2	39,064	Phillips (pen)
25 August 1999	Newcastle United	A	2–1	36,600	Quinn, Phillips
29 August 1999	Coventry City	H	1–1	39,427	Phillips
11 September 1999	Leicester City	H	2–0	40,105	Butler, McCann
18 September 1999	Derby County	A	5–0	28,264	McCann, Phillips (3), Quinn
25 September 1999	Sheffield Wednesday	H	1–0	41,132	Schwarz
2 October 1999	Bradford City	A	4–0	18,204	Rae, Quinn, Phillips (2, 1 pen)
18 October 1999	Aston Villa	H	2–1	41,045	Phillips (2, 1 pen)
24 October 1999	West Ham United	A	1–1	26,022	Phillips
31 October 1999	Tottenham Hotspur	H	2–1	41,904	Quinn (2)
6 November 1999	Middlesbrough	A	1–1	34,793	Reddy
20 November 1999	Liverpool	H	0–2	42,015	
27 November 1999	Watford	A	3–2	21,590	Phillips (2), McCann
4 December 1999	Chelsea	H	4–1	41,377	Quinn (2), Phillips (2)
18 December 1999	Southampton	H	2–0	40,860	Phillips (2)
26 December 1999	Everton	A	0–5	40,017	
28 December 1999	Manchester United	H	2–2	42,026	McCann, Quinn
3 January 2000	Wimbledon	A	0–1	17,621	
15 January 2000	Arsenal	A	1–4	38,039	Quinn
23 January 2000	Leeds United	H	1–2	41,947	Phillips
5 February 2000	Newcastle United	H	2–2	42,192	Phillips (2)
12 February 2000	Coventry City	A	2–3	22,101	Phillips, Rae
26 February 2000	Derby County	H	1–1	41,940	Rae
5 March 2000	Leicester City	A	2–5	20,432	Phillips, Quinn
11 March 2000	Liverpool	A	1–1	44,693	Phillips (pen)
18 March 2000	Middlesbrough	H	1–1	42,013	Quinn
25 March 2000	Everton	H	2–1	41,934	Summerbee, Phillips
1 April 2000	Southampton	A	2–1	15,245	Quinn, Phillips (pen)
8 April 2000	Wimbledon	H	2–1	41,592	Quinn, Kilbane
15 April 2000	Manchester United	A	0–4	61,612	
22 April 2000	Sheffield Wednesday	A	2–0	28,072	Phillips (2)
24 April 2000	Bradford City	H	0–1	40,628	
29 April 2000	Aston Villa	A	1–1	33,949	Quinn
6 May 2000	West Ham United	H	1–0	41,684	Phillips
14 May 2000	Tottenham Hotspur	A	1–3	36,070	Makin

=== FA Cup ===
Round	Date	Opponent	Venue	Result	Attendance	Goalscorers
R3	11 December 1999	Portsmouth	H	1–0	26,535	McCann
R4	8 January 2000	Tranmere Rovers	A	0–1	15,469	

=== League Cup ===
Round	Date	Opponent	Venue	Result	Attendance	Goalscorers
R2 1st Leg	14 September 1999	Walsall	H	3–2	14,388	Williams, Dichio, Barras (own goal)
R2 2nd Leg	21 September 1999	Walsall	A	5–0 (won 8-2 on agg)	5,109	Roy, Dichio (2), Fredgaard (2)
R3	12 October 1999	Wimbledon	A	2–3 (a.e.t.)	5,061	Dichio, Ball

== Players ==
=== First-team squad ===
Squad at end of season

Note: Flags indicate national team as defined under FIFA eligibility rules; some limited exceptions apply. Players may hold more than one non-FIFA nationality.

No.	Pos.	Nation	Player
1	GK	DEN	Thomas Sørensen
2	DF	ENG	Chris Makin
3	DF	ENG	Michael Gray
4	MF	IRL	Kevin Kilbane (Note: Kilbane was born in Preston, England, but also qualified to represent the Republic of Ireland internationally through his parents and represented them at U-21 level before making his international debut for Republic of Ireland in September 1997.)
5	DF	ENG	Steve Bould (captain)
6	DF	IRL	Paul Butler (Note: Butler was born in Moston, England, but also qualified to represent the Republic of Ireland internationally through his paternal step-grandfather, and would make his international debut for the Republic of Ireland in February 2000.)
7	MF	ENG	Nicky Summerbee
8	DF	GER	Thomas Helmer
9	FW	IRL	Niall Quinn
10	FW	ENG	Kevin Phillips
12	FW	ENG	Danny Dichio
13	GK	WAL	Andy Marriott (Note: Marriott was born in Sutton-in-Ashfield, England, and represented them at U-21 level, but also qualified to represent Wales internationally and made his international debut for Wales in 1996.)
14	DF	ENG	Darren Holloway
15	MF	DEN	Carsten Fredgaard

No.	Pos.	Nation	Player
16	MF	SCO	Alex Rae
17	DF	ENG	Jody Craddock
18	DF	ENG	Darren Williams
19	MF	ENG	Paul Thirlwell
20	MF	SWE	Stefan Schwarz
21	MF	ENG	Gavin McCann
22	MF	ENG	Neil Wainwright
23	MF	ENG	Chris Lumsdon
25	DF	ENG	Mark Maley
27	MF	IRL	Thomas Butler
28	MF	WAL	John Oster (Note: Oster was born in Boston, England, but also qualified to represent Wales internationally and represented them at U-18 and U-21 level before making his international debut for Wales in 1997.)
29	MF	FRA	Éric Roy
31	FW	IRL	Michael Reddy
33	FW	HON	Milton Núñez

=== Left club during the season ===
Note: Flags indicate national team as defined under FIFA eligibility rules; some limited exceptions apply. Players may hold more than one non-FIFA nationality.

No.	Pos.	Nation	Player
4	MF	ENG	Kevin Ball (to Fulham)
11	MF	SCO	Allan Johnston (on loan to Birmingham City and Bolton Wanderers)

No.	Pos.	Nation	Player
30	FW	BRA	Marcus di Giuseppe (to Walsall)

=== Reserve squad ===
Note: Flags indicate national team as defined under FIFA eligibility rules; some limited exceptions apply. Players may hold more than one non-FIFA nationality.

No.	Pos.	Nation	Player
24	MF	ENG	Sam Aiston
26	FW	ENG	Michael Proctor
32	MF	IRL	Brendan McGill
34	DF	NIR	George McCartney
35	MF	SCO	David Duke
—	GK	ENG	Jon Kennedy
—	GK	NIR	Michael Ingham (Note: Ingham was born in Preston, England, but also qualified to represent Northern Ireland internationally and represented them at U-18 and U-21 level before making his international debut for Northern Ireland in June 2005.)
—	GK	ENG	Chris Porter
—	GK	IRL	Gregg Shannon

No.	Pos.	Nation	Player
—	DF	IRL	Cliff Byrne
—	DF	ENG	Steve Harrison
—	DF	ENG	David Morgan
—	MF	ENG	Mark Convery
—	MF	ENG	Jonjo Dickman
—	MF	ENG	Gerry Harrison
—	MF	IRL	Finbar Lynch
—	FW	IRL	Keith Graydon
—	FW	SCO	Kevin Kyle

== Transfers ==
=== In ===
Date	Pos	Name	From	Fee
1 July 1999	GK	(Northern Ireland) Michael Ingham	Cliftonville	£30,000
2 July 1999	DF	(England) Steve Bould	Arsenal	£500,000
7 July 1999	DF	(Germany) Thomas Helmer	Bayern Munich	Free transfer
29 July 1999	MF	(Sweden) Stefan Schwarz	Valencia	£4,000,000
6 August 1999	MF	(Wales) John Oster	Everton	£1,000,000
15 August 1999	MF	(France) Éric Roy	Marseille	£200,000
15 December 1999	MF	(Republic of Ireland) Kevin Kilbane	West Bromwich Albion	£2,500,000
23 March 2000	FW	(Honduras) Milton Núñez	PAOK	£1,600,000
23 March 2000	GK	(England) Jon Kennedy	Worksop Town	£90,000

=== Out ===
Date	Pos	Name	To	Fee
2 June 1999	DF	(Wales) Andy Melville	Fulham	Free transfer
7 July 1999	MF	(England) Lee Clark	Fulham	£3,000,000
13 July 1999	MF	(England) John Mullin	Burnley	Free transfer
17 July 1999	DF	(England) Matthew Pitts	Carlisle United	Free transfer
23 July 1999	FW	(England) Michael Bridges	Leeds United	£5,000,000
6 August 1999	FW	(England) Martin Smith	Sheffield United	Free transfer
7 August 1999	FW	(England) Paul Beavers	Oldham Athletic	Free transfer
8 September 1999	GK	(England) Luke Weaver	Carlisle United	Free transfer
8 December 1999	MF	(England) Kevin Ball	Fulham	£200,000
7 March 2000	GK	(England) Chris Porter	Darlington	Free transfer

Transfers in: ▼£9,620,000
Transfers out: ▲£8,200,000
Total spending: ▼£1,420,000

== Statistics ==
=== Appearances and goals ===
No.	Pos	Nat	Player	Total		FA Premier League		FA Cup		League Cup	
No.	Pos	Nat	Player	Apps	Goals	Apps	Goals	Apps	Goals	Apps	Goals
1	GK	(Denmark) DEN	Thomas Sørensen	39	0	37	0	2	0	0	0
2	DF	(England) ENG	Chris Makin	37	1	34	1	2	0	1	0
3	DF	(England) ENG	Michael Gray	38	0	32+1	0	2	0	2+1	0
4	MF	(Republic of Ireland) IRL	Kevin Kilbane	21	2	17+3	1	0	0	0+1	1
5	DF	(England) ENG	Steve Bould	22	0	19+1	0	2	0	0	0
6	DF	(Republic of Ireland) IRL	Paul Butler	36	1	31+1	1	2	0	2	0
7	MF	(England) ENG	Nicky Summerbee	35	1	29+3	1	2	0	1	0
8	DF	(Germany) GER	Thomas Helmer	2	0	1+1	0	0	0	0	0
9	FW	(Republic of Ireland) IRL	Niall Quinn	38	14	35+2	14	1	0	0	0
10	FW	(England) ENG	Kevin Phillips	38	30	36	30	2	0	0	0
12	FW	(England) ENG	Danny Dichio	15	4	0+12	0	0	0	3	4
13	GK	(Wales) WAL	Andy Marriott	4	0	1	0	0	0	3	0
14	MF	(England) ENG	Darren Holloway	17	0	8+7	0	0	0	2	0
15	MF	(Denmark) DEN	Carsten Fredgaard	4	2	0+1	0	0	0	3	2
16	MF	(Scotland) SCO	Alex Rae	30	3	22+4	3	1	0	3	0
17	DF	(England) ENG	Jody Craddock	20	0	18+1	0	0+1	0	0	0
18	DF	(England) ENG	Darren Williams	28	1	13+12	0	0	0	3	1
19	DF	(England) ENG	Paul Thirlwell	9	0	7+1	0	0+1	0	0	0
20	MF	(Sweden) SWE	Stefan Schwarz	29	1	27	1	2	0	0	0
21	MF	(England) ENG	Gavin McCann	27	5	21+3	4	2	1	0+1	0
22	DF	(England) ENG	Neil Wainwright	2	0	0	0	0	0	2	0
23	DF	(England) ENG	Chris Lumsdon	2	0	1	0	0	0	1	0
25	DF	(England) ENG	Mark Maley	1	0	0	0	0	0	1	0
27	MF	(Republic of Ireland) IRL	Thomas Butler	2	0	0+1	0	0	0	0+1	0
28	MF	(Wales) WAL	John Oster	13	0	4+6	0	0	0	3	0
29	MF	(France) FRA	Éric Roy	29	1	19+5	0	2	0	3	1
31	FW	(Republic of Ireland) IRL	Michael Reddy	10	1	0+8	1	0+1	0	0+1	0
33	FW	(Honduras) HON	Milton Núñez	1	0	0+1	0	0	0	0	0
Players no longer with club:
4	DF	(England) ENG	Kevin Ball	12	0	6+5	0	0	0	1	0
30	FW	(Brazil) BRA	Marcus di Giuseppe	1	0	0	0	0	0	0+1	0
