= 1998–99 Sunderland A.F.C. season =

English football club season

Sunderland
1998–99 season
- Chairman: Bob Murray
- Manager: Peter Reid
- Stadium: Stadium of Light
- First Division: 1st (champions)
- FA Cup: Fourth round
- League Cup: Semi-finals
- Top goalscorer: League: Kevin Phillips (23); All: Kevin Phillips (25)
- Average home league attendance: 38,745

During the 1998–99 English football season, Sunderland A.F.C. competed in the Football League First Division.

== Season summary ==
In the 1998–99 season, Sunderland secured their Premier League place by winning the Division One title with a then record 105 League points having topped the First Division table since 24 October 1998. They clinched promotion on 13 April 1999 by winning 5–2 at Bury.

== Final league table ==
Pos	Team	Pld	W	D	L	GF	GA	GD	Pts	Qualification or relegation
1	Sunderland (C, P)	46	31	12	3	91	28	+63	105	Promotion to the Premier League
2	Bradford City (P)	46	26	9	11	82	47	+35	87	Promotion to the Premier League
3	Ipswich Town	46	26	8	12	69	32	+37	86	Qualification for the First Division play-offs
4	Birmingham City	46	23	12	11	66	37	+29	81	Qualification for the First Division play-offs
5	Watford (O, P)	46	21	14	11	65	56	+9	77	Qualification for the First Division play-offs

Rules for classification: 1) Points; 2) Goals scored; 3) Goal difference
(C) Champions; (O) Play-off winners; (P) Promoted

== Results ==
Sunderland's score comes first

=== Legend ===
Win	Draw	Loss

=== Football League First Division ===
==== Results summary ====
Overall								Home						Away					
Pld	W	D	L	GF	GA	GD	Pts	W	D	L	GF	GA	GD	W	D	L	GF	GA	GD
46	31	12	3	91	28	+63	105	19	3	1	50	10	+40	12	9	2	41	18	+23

==== Results by matchday ====
Round	1	2	3	4	5	6	7	8	9	10	11	12	13	14	15	16	17	18	19	20	21	22	23	24	25	26	27	28	29	30	31	32	33	34	35	36	37	38	39	40	41	42	43	44	45	46
Ground	H	A	H	H	A	H	A	H	A	A	H	A	A	H	A	A	H	A	H	A	H	H	H	A	A	H	A	H	A	H	A	H	A	H	H	A	A	H	H	A	H	A	A	H	A	H
Result	W	D	W	W	W	D	D	W	D	D	D	D	D	W	W	W	W	W	L	W	W	W	W	D	L	W	D	W	L	W	W	W	D	W	W	W	W	W	W	D	W	W	W	D	W	W
Position	7	6	6	1	1	2	3	2	1	1	2	2	2	1	1	1	1	1	1	1	1	1	1	1	1	1	1	1	1	1	1	1	1	1	1	1	1	1	1	1	1	1	1	1	1	1

A = Away; H = Home; W = Win; D = Draw; L = Loss

Date	Opponent	Venue	Result	Attendance	Scorers
8 August 1998	Queens Park Rangers	H	1–0	41,008	Phillips (pen)
15 August 1998	Swindon Town	A	1–1	10,207	Phillips
22 August 1998	Tranmere Rovers	H	5–0	34,155	Phillips, Dichio (2), Mullin, Butler
25 August 1998	Watford	H	4–1	36,587	Johnston, Summerbee, Dichio, Melville
29 August 1998	Ipswich Town	A	2–0	15,813	Mullin, Phillips
8 September 1998	Bristol City	H	1–1	34,111	Phillips
12 September 1998	Wolverhampton Wanderers	A	1–1	26,816	Phillips
19 September 1998	Oxford United	H	7–0	34,567	Bridges (2), Gray, Dichio (2, 1 pen), Rae (2)
26 September 1998	Portsmouth	A	1–1	17,022	Johnston
29 September 1998	Norwich City	A	2–2	17,504	Quinn, Marshall (own goal)
3 October 1998	Bradford City	H	0–0	37,828	
18 October 1998	West Bromwich Albion	A	3–2	20,791	Melville, Bridges, Ball
21 October 1998	Huddersfield Town	A	1–1	14,746	Ball
24 October 1998	Bury	H	1–0	38,049	Dichio
1 November 1998	Bolton Wanderers	A	3–0	21,676	Johnston, Quinn, Bridges
3 November 1998	Crewe Alexandra	A	4–1	5,361	Dichio, Gray, Quinn, Bridges
7 November 1998	Grimsby Town	H	3–1	40,077	Smith (2), Quinn
14 November 1998	Port Vale	A	2–0	8,839	Aspin (own goal), Quinn
21 November 1998	Barnsley	H	2–3	40,231	Scott (pen), Quinn
28 November 1998	Sheffield United	A	4–0	25,612	Quinn (2), Bridges (2)
5 December 1998	Stockport County	H	1–0	36,040	Summerbee
12 December 1998	Port Vale	H	2–0	37,583	Smith, Butler
15 December 1998	Crystal Palace	H	2–0	33,870	Scott (pen), Dichio
19 December 1998	Birmingham City	A	0–0	22,095	
26 December 1998	Tranmere Rovers	A	0–1	14,248	
28 December 1998	Crewe Alexandra	H	2–0	41,433	Dichio, Bridges
9 January 1999	Queens Park Rangers	A	2–2	17,444	Phillips, Quinn
17 January 1999	Ipswich Town	H	2–1	39,835	Quinn (2)
30 January 1999	Watford	A	1–2	20,188	Quinn
6 February 1999	Swindon Town	H	2–0	41,304	Quinn, Phillips
13 February 1999	Bristol City	A	1–0	15,736	Phillips (pen)
20 February 1999	Wolverhampton Wanderers	H	2–1	41,268	Johnston, Quinn
27 February 1999	Oxford United	A	0–0	9,044	
2 March 1999	Portsmouth	H	2–0	37,656	Dichio, Phillips
6 March 1999	Norwich City	H	1–0	39,004	Phillips
9 March 1999	Bradford City	A	1–0	15,124	Quinn
13 March 1999	Grimsby Town	A	2–0	9,528	Phillips, Clark
20 March 1999	Bolton Wanderers	H	3–1	41,505	Phillips, Johnston (2)
3 April 1999	West Bromwich Albion	H	3–0	41,135	Phillips (2), Clark
5 April 1999	Crystal Palace	A	1–1	22,096	Phillips
10 April 1999	Huddersfield Town	H	2–0	41,074	Quinn, Johnston
13 April 1999	Bury	A	5–2	8,669	Phillips (4, 1 pen), Quinn
16 April 1999	Barnsley	A	3–1	17,390	Summerbee, Clark, Phillips
24 April 1999	Sheffield United	H	0–0	41,179	
1 May 1999	Stockport County	A	1–0	10,548	Phillips
9 May 1999	Birmingham City	H	2–1	41,634	Phillips, Quinn

=== FA Cup ===
Round	Date	Opponent	Venue	Result	Attendance	Goalscorers
R3	2 January 1999	Lincoln City	A	1–0	10,408	McCann
R4	23 January 1999	Blackburn Rovers	A	0–1	30,125	

=== League Cup ===
Round	Date	Opponent	Venue	Result	Attendance	Goalscorers
R1 1st Leg	11 August 1998	York City	A	2–0	6,277	Dichio (2)
R1 2nd Leg	18 August 1998	York City	H	2–1 (won 4–1 on agg)	22,695	Phillips, Smith
R2 1st Leg	15 September 1998	Chester City	H	3–0	20,618	Scott, Phillips, Bridges
R2 2nd Leg	22 September 1998	Chester City	A	1–0 (won 4–0 on agg)	2,738	Johnston
R3	27 October 1998	Grimsby Town	H	2–1 (a.e.t.)	18,676	Bridges, Quinn
R4	11 November 1998	Everton	A	1–1 (won 5–4 on pens)	28,132	Bridges
QF	1 December 1998	Luton Town	H	3–0	35,742	Johnson (own goal), Bridges, Quinn
SF 1st Leg	26 January 1999	Leicester City	H	1–2	38,332	McCann
SF 2nd Leg	17 February 1999	Leicester City	A	1–1 (lost 2–3 on agg)	21,231	Quinn

== Players ==
=== First-team squad ===
Squad at end of season

Note: Flags indicate national team as defined under FIFA eligibility rules; some limited exceptions apply. Players may hold more than one non-FIFA nationality.

No.	Pos.	Nation	Player
—	GK	ENG	Chris Porter
—	GK	ENG	Luke Weaver
—	GK	WAL	Andy Marriott (Note: Marriott was born in Sutton-in-Ashfield, England, and represented them at U-21 level, but also qualified to represent Wales internationally and made his international debut for Wales in 1996.)
—	GK	IRL	Gregg Shannon
—	GK	DEN	Thomas Sørensen
—	DF	ENG	Paul Butler (Note: Butler was born in Moston, England, but also qualified to represent the Republic of Ireland internationally through his paternal step-grandfather, and would make his international debut for the Republic of Ireland in February 2000.)
—	DF	ENG	Jody Craddock
—	DF	ENG	Elliott Dickman
—	DF	ENG	Michael Gray
—	DF	ENG	Paul Heckingbottom
—	DF	ENG	Darren Holloway
—	DF	ENG	Chris Makin
—	DF	ENG	Mark Maley
—	DF	ENG	Matthew Pitts
—	DF	WAL	Andy Melville
—	DF	SCO	Allan Johnston
—	DF	NIR	George McCartney
—	MF	ENG	Sam Aiston
—	MF	ENG	Kevin Ball
—	MF	ENG	Lee Clark
—	MF	ENG	Jonjo Dickman

No.	Pos.	Nation	Player
—	MF	ENG	Gerry Harrison
—	MF	ENG	Chris Lumsdon
—	MF	ENG	Gavin McCann
—	MF	ENG	John Mullin
—	MF	ENG	Martin Scott
—	MF	ENG	Nicky Summerbee
—	MF	ENG	Paul Thirlwell
—	MF	ENG	Neil Wainwright
—	MF	ENG	Darren Williams
—	MF	SCO	David Duke
—	MF	SCO	Alex Rae
—	MF	IRL	Thomas Butler
—	MF	IRL	Brendan McGill
—	MF	DEN	Carsten Fredgaard
—	FW	ENG	Michael Bridges
—	FW	ENG	Danny Dichio
—	FW	ENG	Kevin Phillips
—	FW	ENG	Michael Proctor
—	FW	ENG	Martin Smith
—	FW	SCO	Kevin Kyle
—	FW	IRL	Niall Quinn

=== Appearances and goals ===
No.	Pos	Nat	Player	Total		Division One		FA Cup		Worthington Cup	
No.	Pos	Nat	Player	Apps	Goals	Apps	Goals	Apps	Goals	Apps	Goals
Goalkeepers
	GK	(Wales) WAL	Andy Marriott	1	0	1	0	0	0	0	0
	GK	(Denmark) DEN	Thomas Sorensen	56	0	45	0	2	0	9	0
	GK	(England) ENG	Luke Weaver	0	0	0	0	0	0	0	0
Defenders
	DF	(England) ENG	Paul Butler	53	2	44	2	2	0	6+1	0
	DF	(England) ENG	Jody Craddock	11	0	3+3	0	0	0	3+2	0
	DF	(England) ENG	Michael Gray	44	2	36+1	2	2	0	5	0
	DF	(England) ENG	Darren Holloway	6	0	1+5	0	0	0	0	0
	DF	(England) ENG	Chris Makin	47	0	37+1	0	2	0	7	0
	DF	(England) ENG	Mark Maley	1	0	0	0	0	0	1	0
	DF	(Wales) WAL	Andy Melville	52	2	44	2	2	0	6	0
	DF	(England) ENG	Martin Scott	23	3	14+2	2	1	0	6	1
	DF	(England) ENG	Darren Williams	30	0	16+9	0	1	0	4	0
Midfielders
	MF	(England) ENG	Sam Aiston	2	0	0+1	0	0	0	0+1	0
	MF	(England) ENG	Kevin Ball	47	2	42	2	1	0	4	0
	MF	(England) ENG	Lee Clark	33	3	26+1	3	2	0	3+1	0
	MF	(England) ENG	Gerry Harrison	1	0	0	0	0	0	1	0
	MF	(Scotland) SCO	Allan Johnston	48	8	40	7	1	0	6+1	1
	MF	(England) ENG	Chris Lumsdon	1	0	0	0	0	0	0+1	0
	MF	(England) ENG	Gavin McCann	14	2	5+6	0	1+1	1	1	1
	MF	(England) ENG	John Mullin	15	2	8+2	2	0	0	4+1	0
	MF	(Scotland) SCO	Alex Rae	18	2	12+3	2	1	0	2	0
	MF	(England) ENG	Nicky Summerbee	43	3	36	3	0+1	0	5+1	0
	MF	(England) ENG	Paul Thirlwell	5	0	1+1	0	0	0	2+1	0
	MF	(England) ENG	Neil Wainwright	5	0	0+2	0	0	0	2+1	0
Forwards
	FW	(England) ENG	Michael Bridges	36	12	13+16	8	0	0	5+2	4
	FW	(England) ENG	Danny Dichio	43	12	16+20	10	1+1	0	4+1	2
	FW	(England) ENG	Kevin Phillips	32	25	26	23	1	0	5	2
	FW	(England) ENG	Michael Proctor	1	0	0	0	0	0	0+1	0
	FW	(Republic of Ireland) IRL	Niall Quinn	46	21	36+3	18	2	0	4+1	3
	FW	(England) ENG	Martin Smith	15	4	4+4	3	0+1	0	4+2	1
