= 2000–01 Sunderland A.F.C. season =

English football club season

Sunderland A.F.C.
2000–01 season
- Chairman: Bob Murray
- Manager: Peter Reid
- Stadium: Stadium of Light
- FA Premier League: 7th
- FA Cup: Fifth round
- League Cup: Quarter-final
- Top goalscorer: League: Kevin Phillips (14); All: Kevin Phillips (18)
- Highest home attendance: 48,285 vs Leeds United (31 March 2001, FA Premier League)
- Lowest home attendance: 24,668 vs Luton Town (19 September 2000, League Cup)
- Average home league attendance: 46,791
Home colours	Away colours

During the 2000–01 English football season, Sunderland A.F.C. competed in the FA Premier League.

== Season summary ==
Sunderland enjoyed another strong season, and briefly occupied second place in February, but the Black Cats were unable to keep up their excellent form, and they had to settle for seventh place – just as they did last season, and not quite enough for UEFA Cup qualification.

== Results ==
Sunderland's score comes first

=== Legend ===
Win	Draw	Loss

=== FA Premier League ===
==== League table ====
Pos	Team	Pld	W	D	L	GF	GA	GD	Pts	Qualification or relegation
5	Ipswich Town	38	20	6	12	57	42	+15	66	Qualification for the UEFA Cup first round (Note: Since Liverpool won the League Cup and qualified for the Champions League, their UEFA Cup place went to fifth-placed Ipswich Town. Since both FA Cup finalists, Liverpool and Arsenal, qualified for the Champions League, the berth in the UEFA Cup went to sixth-placed Chelsea. Both Ipswich and Chelsea were the highest-ranked team not already qualified for a European competition.)
6	Chelsea	38	17	10	11	68	45	+23	61	Qualification for the UEFA Cup first round
7	Sunderland	38	15	12	11	46	41	+5	57	
8	Aston Villa	38	13	15	10	46	43	+3	54	Qualification for the Intertoto Cup third round
9	Charlton Athletic	38	14	10	14	50	57	−7	52	

Source: Premier League
Rules for classification: 1) points; 2) goal difference; 3) number of goals scored.

==== Results summary ====
Overall								Home						Away					
Pld	W	D	L	GF	GA	GD	Pts	W	D	L	GF	GA	GD	W	D	L	GF	GA	GD
38	15	12	11	46	41	+5	57	9	7	3	24	16	+8	6	5	8	22	25	−3

Source: 2000-01 FA Premier League table

==== Results by round ====
Round	1	2	3	4	5	6	7	8	9	10	11	12	13	14	15	16	17	18	19	20	21	22	23	24	25	26	27	28	29	30	31	32	33	34	35	36	37	38
Ground	H	A	A	H	A	H	A	H	H	A	H	A	H	A	A	H	H	A	H	A	A	H	A	H	H	A	H	A	H	A	H	A	H	A	H	A	H	A
Result	W	L	L	D	L	W	D	D	W	D	W	L	D	W	W	W	W	L	W	W	D	W	W	D	L	L	D	L	D	W	L	D	L	L	D	W	W	D
Position	7	13	15	14	17	13	13	14	10	12	9	12	11	9	8	6	4	5	6	3	4	3	2	2	3	4	4	4	5	4	6	6	7	7	8	7	7	7

Source: 11v11.com: 2000-01 Sunderland results
A = Away; H = Home; W = Win; D = Draw; L = Loss

Date	Opponent	Venue	Result	Attendance	Scorers
19 August 2000	Arsenal	Stadium of Light	1–0	46,347	Quinn
23 August 2000	Manchester City	Maine Road	2–4	34,410	Quinn, Phillips
26 August 2000	Ipswich Town	Portman Road	0–1	21,830	
5 September 2000	West Ham United	Stadium of Light	1–1	46,605	Arca
9 September 2000	Manchester United	Old Trafford	0–3	67,503	
16 September 2000	Derby County	Stadium of Light	2–1	45,343	Kilbane, Phillips
23 September 2000	Liverpool	Anfield	1–1	44,713	Phillips
1 October 2000	Leicester City	Stadium of Light	0–0	45,338	
14 October 2000	Chelsea	Stadium of Light	1–0	45,078	Phillips (pen)
22 October 2000	Aston Villa	Villa Park	0–0	27,215	
28 October 2000	Coventry City	Stadium of Light	1–0	44,526	Thome
4 November 2000	Tottenham Hotspur	White Hart Lane	1–2	36,016	Hutchison
11 November 2000	Southampton	Stadium of Light	2–2	45,064	Quinn, Hutchison
18 November 2000	Newcastle United	St James' Park	2–1	52,030	Hutchison, Quinn
25 November 2000	Charlton Athletic	The Valley	1–0	20,043	Rae
4 December 2000	Everton	Stadium of Light	2–0	46,372	Rae, Phillips
9 December 2000	Middlesbrough	Stadium of Light	1–0	47,742	Gray
16 December 2000	Leeds United	Elland Road	0–2	40,053	
23 December 2000	Manchester City	Stadium of Light	1–0	47,475	Hutchison
26 December 2000	Bradford City	Valley Parade	4–1	20,370	Quinn, Phillips (3)
30 December 2000	Arsenal	Highbury	2–2	38,026	Phillips (pen), McCann
1 January 2001	Ipswich Town	Stadium of Light	4–1	46,053	Arca, Phillips, Dichio, Schwarz
13 January 2001	West Ham United	Boleyn Ground	2–0	26,014	Varga, Hutchison
21 January 2001	Bradford City	Stadium of Light	0–0	47,812	
31 January 2001	Manchester United	Stadium of Light	0–1	48,260	
3 February 2001	Derby County	Pride Park	0–1	29,129	
10 February 2001	Liverpool	Stadium of Light	1–1	47,553	Hutchison
24 February 2001	Leicester City	Filbert Street	0–2	21,086	
5 March 2001	Aston Villa	Stadium of Light	1–1	47,196	McCann
17 March 2001	Chelsea	Stamford Bridge	4–2	34,981	Hutchison (2), McCann, Phillips
31 March 2001	Leeds United	Stadium of Light	0–2	48,285	
9 April 2001	Middlesbrough	Riverside Stadium	0–0	31,284	
14 April 2001	Tottenham Hotspur	Stadium of Light	2–3	48,029	Kilbane, Quinn
16 April 2001	Coventry City	Highfield Road	0–1	20,946	
21 April 2001	Newcastle United	Stadium of Light	1–1	48,277	Carteron
28 April 2001	Southampton	The Dell	1–0	15,249	Kilbane
5 May 2001	Charlton Athletic	Stadium of Light	3–2	47,671	Kilbane, Quinn, Phillips
19 May 2001	Everton	Goodison Park	2–2	37,444	Phillips (2)

=== FA Cup ===
Round	Date	Opponent	Venue	Result	Attendance	Goalscorers
3rd Round	6 January 2001	Crystal Palace	Stadium of Light	0–0	30,908	
3rd Round Replay	17 January 2001	Crystal Palace	Selhurst Park	4–2	15,454	Quinn, Phillips (2), Kilbane
4th Round	27 January 2001	Ipswich Town	Stadium of Light	1–0	33,626	Dichio
5th Round	17 February 2001	West Ham United	Stadium of Light	0–1	36,005	

=== League Cup ===
Round	Date	Opponent	Venue	Result	Attendance	Goalscorers
2nd Round, 1st Leg	19 September 2000	Luton Town	Stadium of Light	3–0	24,668	Oster, Phillips, Thirlwell
2nd Round, 2nd Leg	26 September 2000	Luton Town	Kenilworth Road	2–1 (won 5–1 on agg)	5,262	Reddy, Butler
3rd Round	31 October 2000	Bristol Rovers	Memorial Stadium	2–1	11,433	Hutchison (2)
4th Round	28 November 2000	Manchester United	Stadium of Light	2–1	47,543	Arca, Phillips (pen)
5th Round	19 December 2000	Crystal Palace	Selhurst Park	1–2	15,945	Rae

== Players ==
=== First-team squad ===
Squad at end of season

Note: Flags indicate national team as defined under FIFA eligibility rules; some limited exceptions apply. Players may hold more than one non-FIFA nationality.

No.	Pos.	Nation	Player
1	GK	DEN	Thomas Sørensen
2	DF	FRA	Patrice Carteron (on loan from Saint-Étienne)
3	DF	ENG	Michael Gray (captain)
4	MF	SCO	Don Hutchison (Note: Hutchison was born in Gateshead, England, but also qualified to represent Scotland internationally through his father and represented them at B level before making his international debut for Scotland in March 1999.)
5	DF	ENG	Steve Bould
6	DF	IRL	Paul Butler (Note: Butler was born in Moston, England, but also qualified to represent the Republic of Ireland internationally through his paternal step-grandfather, and would make his international debut for the Republic of Ireland in February 2000.)
8	MF	ENG	Gavin McCann
9	FW	IRL	Niall Quinn
10	FW	ENG	Kevin Phillips
11	MF	IRL	Kevin Kilbane (Note: Kilbane was born in Preston, England, but also qualified to represent the Republic of Ireland internationally through his parents and represented them at U-21 level before making his international debut for Republic of Ireland in September 1997.)
12	FW	ENG	Daniele Dichio
14	DF	ENG	Darren Holloway
15	MF	DEN	Carsten Fredgaard
16	MF	SCO	Alex Rae
17	DF	ENG	Jody Craddock
18	DF	ENG	Darren Williams
19	MF	FRA	Éric Roy
20	MF	SWE	Stefan Schwarz

No.	Pos.	Nation	Player
21	MF	ENG	Paul Thirlwell
22	MF	ENG	Neil Wainwright
23	MF	ENG	Chris Lumsdon
24	DF	NIR	George McCartney
25	DF	ENG	Mark Maley
26	MF	IRL	Thomas Butler
27	FW	IRL	Michael Reddy
28	MF	WAL	John Oster (Note: Oster was born in Boston, England, but also qualified to represent Wales internationally and represented them at U-18 and U-21 level before making his international debut for Wales in 1997.)
29	MF	BEL	Tom Peeters
30	GK	AUT	Jürgen Macho
31	FW	HON	Milton Núñez
32	DF	SVK	Stanislav Varga
33	DF	ARG	Julio Arca
34	FW	SCO	Kevin Kyle
36	DF	BRA	Emerson Thome
37	MF	IRL	Brendan McGill
38	MF	ENG	Ben Clark

=== Left club during season ===
Note: Flags indicate national team as defined under FIFA eligibility rules; some limited exceptions apply. Players may hold more than one non-FIFA nationality.

No. / Pos. / Nation / Player; 2 / DF / ENG / Chris Makin (to Ipswich Town)	No. / Pos. / Nation / Player; 40 / GK / NIR / Michael Ingham (Note: Ingham was born in Preston, England, but also qualified to represent Northern Ireland internationally and represented them at U-18 and U-21 level before making his international debut for Northern Ireland in June 2005.) (on loan to Cliftonville)

=== Reserve squad ===
Note: Flags indicate national team as defined under FIFA eligibility rules; some limited exceptions apply. Players may hold more than one non-FIFA nationality.

No.	Pos.	Nation	Player
—	DF	IRL	Cliff Byrne
—	DF	ENG	Craig James
—	DF	IRL	Glen Lacey
—	DF	ENG	Simon Ramsden
—	DF	IRL	Mark Rossiter

No.	Pos.	Nation	Player
—	MF	ENG	Mark Convery
—	MF	ENG	Jonjo Dickman
—	FW	IRL	Keith Graydon
—	FW	ENG	Michael Proctor
—	FW	SCO	Dene Shields

== Transfers ==
=== In ===
==== Summer ====
Date	Pos	Name	From	Fee
14 July 2000	MF	(Belgium) Tom Peeters	(Belgium) KV Mechelen	£250,000
14 July 2000	GK	(Austria) Jurgen Macho	(Austria) First Vienna	Free
14 July 2000	MF	(Scotland) Don Hutchison	(England) Everton	£2,500,000
25 July 2000	MF	(Argentina) Julio Arca	(Argentina) Argentinos Juniors	£3,500,000
27 July 2000	DF	(Slovakia) Stanislav Varga	(Slovakia) Slovan Bratislava	£875,000
31 August 2000	DF	(Brazil) Emerson Thome	(England) Chelsea	£4,500,000

==== January ====
Date	Pos	Name	From	Fee
7 March 2001	DF	(France) Patrice Carteron	(France) Saint-Étienne	Season-long loan

=== Out ===
==== Summer ====
Date	Pos	Name	To	Fee
1 June 2000	DF	(Germany) Thomas Helmer	Retired	Retired
1 June 2000	MF	(England) Darren Holloway	(England) Wimbledon	£1,200,000
11 August 2000	GK	(Northern Ireland) Michael Ingham	(Northern Ireland) Cliftonville	Loan
1 September 2000	DF	(England) Steve Bould	Retired	Retired

==== January ====
Date	Pos	Name	To	Fee
1 January 2001	MF	(France) Éric Roy	(France) Troyes	Free
4 January 2001	MF	(England) Nicky Summerbee	(England) Bolton Wanderers	Free
31 January 2001	DF	(Republic of Ireland) Paul Butler	(England) Wolverhampton Wanderers	£1,000,000
7 March 2001	DF	(England) Chris Makin	(England) Ipswich Town	£1,250,000

== Statistics ==
=== Appearances and goals ===
As of end of season

No.	Pos	Nat	Player	Total		FA Premier League		FA Cup		League Cup	
No.	Pos	Nat	Player	Apps	Goals	Apps	Goals	Apps	Goals	Apps	Goals
Goalkeepers
1	GK	(Denmark) DEN	Thomas Sørensen	42	0	34	0	4	0	4	0
30	GK	(Austria) AUT	Jurgen Macho	7	0	4+1	0	0	0	1+1	0
Defenders
2	DF	(France) FRA	Patrice Carteron	8	1	8	1	0	0	0	0
3	DF	(England) ENG	Michael Gray	41	1	36	1	2	0	3	0
5	DF	(England) ENG	Steve Bould	1	0	0+1	0	0	0	0	0
6	DF	(Republic of Ireland) IRL	Paul Butler	6	1	3	0	0	0	3	1
17	DF	(England) ENG	Jody Craddock	36	0	33+1	0	1	0	1	0
18	DF	(England) ENG	Darren Williams	36	1	21+7	0	4	0	4	1
21	DF	(England) ENG	Paul Thirlwell	7	1	3+2	0	0	0	2	1
24	DF	(Northern Ireland) NIR	George McCartney	6	0	1+1	0	0+1	0	2+1	0
25	DF	(England) ENG	Mark Maley	1	0	0	0	0	0	1	0
32	DF	(Slovakia) SVK	Stanislav Varga	19	1	9+3	1	4	0	2+1	0
33	DF	(Argentina) ARG	Julio Arca	30	3	26+1	2	1	0	2	1
36	DF	(Brazil) BRA	Emerson Thome	36	1	30+1	1	3	0	2	0
38	DF	(England) ENG	Ben Clark	1	0	0	0	0	0	1	0
Midfielders:
4	MF	(Scotland) SCO	Don Hutchison	37	10	30+2	8	3	0	2	2
8	MF	(England) ENG	Gavin McCann	28	3	22	3	4	0	0+2	0
11	MF	(Republic of Ireland) IRL	Kevin Kilbane	34	5	26+4	4	0+3	1	1	0
14	MF	(England) ENG	Darren Holloway	6	0	5	0	0	0	1	0
15	MF	(Denmark) DEN	Carsten Fredgaard	1	0	0	0	0	0	0+1	0
16	MF	(Scotland) SCO	Alex Rae	25	3	18	2	3	0	4	1
19	MF	(France) FRA	Éric Roy	5	0	1+2	0	0	0	2	0
20	MF	(Sweden) SWE	Stefan Schwarz	25	1	17+3	1	4	0	1	0
22	MF	(England) ENG	Neil Wainwright	1	0	0	0	0	0	1	0
26	MF	(Republic of Ireland) IRL	Thomas Butler	5	0	0+4	0	0	0	0+1	0
28	MF	(Wales) WAL	John Oster	14	1	2+6	0	1+1	0	3+1	1
29	MF	(Belgium) BEL	Tom Peeters	1	0	0	0	0	0	1	0
37	MF	(Republic of Ireland) IRL	Brendan McGill	1	0	0	0	0	0	0+1	0
Forwards:
9	FW	(Republic of Ireland) IRL	Niall Quinn	37	8	32+2	7	2+1	1	0	0
10	FW	(England) ENG	Kevin Phillips	42	18	34	14	4	2	3+1	2
12	FW	(England) ENG	Danny Dichio	23	2	2+13	1	2+2	1	4	0
27	FW	(Republic of Ireland) IRL	Michael Reddy	4	1	0+2	0	0	0	2	1
31	FW	(Honduras) HON	Milton Núñez	1	0	0	0	0	0	0+1	0
Players no longer with club:
2	DF	(England) ENG	Chris Makin	28	0	21+2	0	2+1	0	2	0
