= 2001–02 Sunderland A.F.C. season =

English football club season

Sunderland
2001–02 season
- Chairman: Bob Murray
- Manager: Peter Reid
- Stadium: Stadium of Light
- FA Premier League: 17th
- FA Cup: Third round
- League Cup: Second round
- Top goalscorer: League: Kevin Phillips (11); All: Kevin Phillips (13)
- Average home league attendance: 44,108

During the 2001–02 season, Sunderland competed in the FA Premier League.

== Season summary ==
In the 2001–02 season, despite standing 9th on Boxing Day 2001, Sunderland narrowly avoided relegation. They were the lowest scoring team in the Premier League, with 29 goals, ending the season in 17th place and being knocked out of both English Cup competitions in their first rounds.

== Results ==
Sunderland's score comes first

=== Legend ===
Win	Draw	Loss

=== FA Premier League ===
==== League table ====
Pos	Team	Pld	W	D	L	GF	GA	GD	Pts	Qualification or relegation
15	Everton	38	11	10	17	45	57	−12	43	
16	Bolton Wanderers	38	9	13	16	44	62	−18	40	
17	Sunderland	38	10	10	18	29	51	−22	40	
18	Ipswich Town (R)	38	9	9	20	41	64	−23	36	UEFA Cup QR and relegation to the First Division (Note: Ipswich Town qualified for the UEFA Cup qualifying as the winners of Premiership Fair Play League by The Football Association, and as one of the UEFA Fair Play ranking winners.)
19	Derby County (R)	38	8	6	24	33	63	−30	30	Relegation to the Football League First Division

Source: Premier League
Rules for classification: 1) points; 2) goal difference; 3) number of goals scored.
(R) Relegated

==== Results per matchday ====
Matchday	1	2	3	4	5	6	7	8	9	10	11	12	13	14	15	16	17	18	19	20	21	22	23	24	25	26	27	28	29	30	31	32	33	34	35	36	37	38
Ground	H	A	A	H	A	H	H	A	H	A	H	A	H	A	H	H	A	H	A	A	H	A	H	H	A	A	H	A	H	A	H	A	H	A	H	A	A	H
Result	W	L	D	W	D	L	D	W	L	L	D	L	W	L	W	D	L	W	W	L	D	L	D	L	L	W	L	L	W	L	D	L	W	L	L	L	D	D
Position	7	10	10	6	7	8	7	5	9	12	12	15	13	13	11	13	13	11	9	10	10	12	11	11	15	11	14	14	13	14	15	16	14	15	15	17	17	17

Source: Statto.com
A = Away; H = Home; W = Win; D = Draw; L = Loss

Date	Opponent	Venue	Result	Attendance	Scorers
18 August 2001	Ipswich Town	H	1–0	47,370	Phillips (pen)
22 August 2001	Fulham	A	0–2	20,197	
26 August 2001	Newcastle United	A	1–1	52,021	Phillips
8 September 2001	Blackburn Rovers	H	1–0	45,103	Quinn
16 September 2001	Aston Villa	A	0–0	31,668	
19 September 2001	Tottenham Hotspur	H	1–2	47,310	Phillips
22 September 2001	Charlton Athletic	H	2–2	46,825	Quinn (2)
29 September 2001	Bolton Wanderers	A	2–0	24,520	Phillips, Craddock
13 October 2001	Manchester United	H	1–3	48,305	Phillips
22 October 2001	Middlesbrough	A	0–2	28,432	
27 October 2001	Arsenal	H	1–1	48,029	Schwarz
3 November 2001	Leicester City	A	0–1	20,573	
18 November 2001	Leeds United	H	2–0	48,005	Arca, Phillips
25 November 2001	Liverpool	A	0–1	43,537	
1 December 2001	West Ham United	H	1–0	47,437	Phillips
9 December 2001	Chelsea	H	0–0	48,017	
15 December 2001	Southampton	A	0–2	29,459	
22 December 2001	Everton	H	1–0	48,013	Reyna
26 December 2001	Blackburn Rovers	A	3–0	29,869	Quinn (2), Kilbane
29 December 2001	Ipswich Town	A	0–5	24,517	
1 January 2002	Aston Villa	H	1–1	45,324	Thome
12 January 2002	Everton	A	0–1	30,736	
19 January 2002	Fulham	H	1–1	45,124	Phillips
29 January 2002	Middlesbrough	H	0–1	44,579	
2 February 2002	Manchester United	A	1–4	67,587	Phillips
9 February 2002	Derby County	A	1–0	31,771	Quinn
24 February 2002	Newcastle United	H	0–1	48,290	
2 March 2002	Tottenham Hotspur	A	1–2	36,062	M'Boma
5 March 2002	Bolton Wanderers	H	1–0	43,011	McAteer
16 March 2002	Chelsea	A	0–4	40,218	
23 March 2002	Southampton	H	1–1	46,120	McAteer
30 March 2002	Arsenal	A	0–3	38,047	
1 April 2002	Leicester City	H	2–1	44,950	Reyna (2)
7 April 2002	Leeds United	A	0–2	39,195	
13 April 2002	Liverpool	H	0–1	48,355	
20 April 2002	West Ham United	A	0–3	33,319	
27 April 2002	Charlton Athletic	A	2–2	26,614	Kilbane, Phillips
11 May 2002	Derby County	H	1–1	47,989	Phillips

=== FA Cup ===
Round	Date	Opponent	Venue	Result	Attendance	Goalscorers
R3	5 January 2002	West Bromwich Albion	H	1–2	29,133	Phillips

=== League Cup ===
Round	Date	Opponent	Venue	Result	Attendance	Goalscorers
R2	12 September 2001	Sheffield Wednesday	A	2–4 (a.e.t.)	12,074	Phillips, Laslandes

== Players ==
=== First-team squad ===
Squad at end of season

Note: Flags indicate national team as defined under FIFA eligibility rules; some limited exceptions apply. Players may hold more than one non-FIFA nationality.

No.	Pos.	Nation	Player
1	GK	(Denmark) DEN	Thomas Sorensen
2	DF	(Switzerland) SUI	Bernt Haas (Note: Haas was born in Vienna, Austria, but also qualified to represent Switzerland internationally and made his international debut for Switzerland in 1996.)
3	DF	(England) ENG	Michael Gray (captain)
4	MF	(United States) USA	Claudio Reyna
5	DF	(Slovakia) SVK	Stanislav Varga
6	DF	(Brazil) BRA	Emerson Thome
7	FW	(Cameroon) CMR	Patrick M'Boma (on loan from Parma)
8	MF	(England) ENG	Gavin McCann
9	FW	(Republic of Ireland) IRL	Niall Quinn
10	FW	(England) ENG	Kevin Phillips
11	MF	(Republic of Ireland) IRL	Kevin Kilbane (Note: Kilbane was born in Preston, England, but also qualified to represent the Republic of Ireland internationally through his parents and represented them at U-21 level before making his international debut for Republic of Ireland in September 1997.)
12	DF	(Sweden) SWE	Joachim Björklund

No.	Pos.	Nation	Player
13	GK	(Northern Ireland) NIR	Michael Ingham (Note: Ingham was born in Preston, England, but also qualified to represent Northern Ireland internationally and represented them at U-18 and U-21 level before making his international debut for Northern Ireland in June 2005.)
15	FW	(France) FRA	David Bellion
16	MF	(Republic of Ireland) IRL	Jason McAteer (Note: McAteer was born in Tranmere, England, but also qualified to represent the Republic of Ireland internationally and made his international debut for the Republic of Ireland in March 1994.)
17	DF	(England) ENG	Jody Craddock
18	DF	(England) ENG	Darren Williams
19	FW	(Scotland) SCO	Kevin Kyle
20	MF	(Sweden) SWE	Stefan Schwarz
21	MF	(England) ENG	Paul Thirlwell
24	DF	(Northern Ireland) NIR	George McCartney
26	MF	(Republic of Ireland) IRL	Thomas Butler
30	GK	(Austria) AUT	Jürgen Macho
33	DF	(Argentina) ARG	Julio Arca

=== Left club during season ===
Note: Flags indicate national team as defined under FIFA eligibility rules; some limited exceptions apply. Players may hold more than one non-FIFA nationality.

No.	Pos.	Nation	Player
4	MF	(Scotland) SCO	Don Hutchison (Note: Hutchison was born in Gateshead, England, but also qualified to represent Scotland internationally through his father and represented them at B level before making his international debut for Scotland in March 1999.) (to West Ham United)
7	FW	(France) FRA	Lilian Laslandes (on loan to Köln)
12	FW	(England) ENG	Danny Dichio (to West Bromwich Albion)

No.	Pos.	Nation	Player
16	MF	(Scotland) SCO	Alex Rae (to Wolverhampton Wanderers)
23	MF	(England) ENG	Chris Lumsdon (to Barnsley)
37	MF	(England) ENG	Neil Wainwright (to Darlington)

=== Reserves ===
The following players did not appear for the first team this season.

Note: Flags indicate national team as defined under FIFA eligibility rules; some limited exceptions apply. Players may hold more than one non-FIFA nationality.

No.	Pos.	Nation	Player
14	MF	(Argentina) ARG	Nicolás Medina
22	DF	(England) ENG	Simon Ramsden
25	DF	(England) ENG	Mark Maley
27	FW	(Republic of Ireland) IRL	Michael Reddy
28	MF	(Wales) WAL	John Oster (Note: Oster was born in Boston, England, but also qualified to represent Wales internationally and represented them at U-18 and U-21 level before making his international debut for Wales in 1997.)
29	MF	(Belgium) BEL	Tom Peeters
31	DF	(England) ENG	Ben Clark
32	DF	(Netherlands) NED	Baki Mercimek (Note: Mercimek was born in Amsterdam, the Netherlands, but also qualified to represent Turkey internationally and would represent them at U-21 level before making his international debut for Turkey in 2006.)
34	FW	(England) ENG	Michael Proctor
35	MF	(Republic of Ireland) IRL	Brendan McGill
36	DF	(Republic of Ireland) IRL	Cliff Byrne
40	GK	(England) ENG	John Kennedy
—	GK	(England) ENG	Adam Dowell
—	DF	(England) ENG	Patrick Collins

No.	Pos.	Nation	Player
—	DF	(England) ENG	Steve Harrison
—	DF	(England) ENG	Craig James
—	DF	(England) ENG	Gareth Mordey
—	DF	(Republic of Ireland) IRL	Stephen Capper
—	DF	(Republic of Ireland) IRL	Mark Rossiter
—	MF	(England) ENG	Jonjo Dickman
—	MF	(England) ENG	Marc Hand
—	MF	(England) ENG	Carl Shippen
—	MF	(Northern Ireland) NIR	Chris Kingsberry
—	MF	(Republic of Ireland) IRL	Glenn Lacey
—	MF	(Republic of Ireland) IRL	Richie Ryan
—	FW	(Scotland) SCO	Dene Shields
—	FW	(Northern Ireland) NIR	Neil Teggart
—	FW	(Republic of Ireland) IRL	Keith Graydon

== Transfers ==
=== In ===
Date	Pos	Name	From	Fee
18 May 2001	MF	(Argentina) Nicolas Medina	(Argentina) Argentinos Juniors	£3,500,000
13 June 2001	DF	(Netherlands) Baki Mercimek	(Netherlands) Haarlem	Free
28 June 2001	FW	(France) Lilian Laslandes	(France) Bordeaux	£3,600,000
3 July 2001	FW	(France) David Bellion	(France) Cannes	Free
3 August 2001	DF	(Switzerland) Bernt Haas	(Switzerland) Grasshopper	£750,000
19 October 2001	MF	(Republic of Ireland) Jason McAteer	(England) Blackburn Rovers	£1 million
7 December 2001	MF	(United States) Claudio Reyna	(Scotland) Rangers	£4 million
28 January 2002	DF	(Sweden) Joachim Björklund	(Italy) Venezia	£1.5 million

=== Out ===
Date	Pos	Name	To	Fee
1 July 2001	MF	(Denmark) Carsten Fredgaard	(Denmark) FC Copenhagen	£500,000
18 August 2001	MF	(England) Neil Wainwright	(England) Darlington	£50,000
30 August 2001	MF	(Scotland) Don Hutchison	(England) West Ham United	£5 million
19 September 2001	MF	(Scotland) Alex Rae	(England) Wolverhampton Wanderers	£1.2 million
30 November 2001	FW	(England) Danny Dichio	(England) West Bromwich Albion	£1.25 million
11 December 2001	MF	(England) Chris Lumsdon	(England) Barnsley	£350,000

=== Loan in ===
Date	Pos	Name	Club	Return	Ref
14 February 2002	FW	(Cameroon) Patrick M'Boma	Parma	11 May 2002	

=== Loan out ===
Date	Pos	Name	Club	Return	Ref
9 August 2001	FW	(England) Michael Proctor	York City	21 April 2002	
22 August 2001	FW	(England) Danny Dichio	West Bromwich Albion	22 September 2001	
7 September 2001	MF	(Republic of Ireland) Brendan McGill	Carlisle United	21 April 2002	
21 September 2001	FW	(Republic of Ireland) Michael Reddy	Hull City	21 October 2001	
27 September 2001	DF	(England) Mark Maley	York City	21 April 2002	
5 October 2001	MF	(England) Chris Lumsdon	Barnsley	11 December 2001	
19 October 2001	MF	(Wales) John Oster	Barnsley	19 November 2001	
7 January 2002	FW	(France) Lilian Laslandes	Köln	9 March 2002	
25 March 2002	DF	(Slovakia) Stanislav Varga	West Bromwich Albion	25 April 2002	
28 March 2002	FW	(Republic of Ireland) Michael Reddy	Barnsley	22 April 2002	

== Statistics ==
=== Appearances and goals ===
As of end of season

No.	Pos	Nat	Player	Total		Premier League		FA Cup		League Cup	
No.	Pos	Nat	Player	Apps	Goals	Apps	Goals	Apps	Goals	Apps	Goals
Goalkeepers
1	GK	(Denmark) DEN	Thomas Sørensen	35	0	34	0	1	0	0	0
13	GK	(Northern Ireland) NIR	Michael Ingham	1	0	0	0	0	0	1	0
30	GK	(Austria) AUT	Jurgen Macho	4	0	4	0	0	0	0	0
Defenders
2	DF	(Switzerland) SUI	Bernt Haas	29	0	27	0	1	0	0+1	0
3	DF	(England) ENG	Michael Gray	36	0	35	0	0	0	1	0
5	DF	(Slovakia) SVK	Stanislav Varga	11	0	9	0	1	0	1	0
6	DF	(Brazil) BRA	Emerson Thome	12	1	12	1	0	0	0	0
12	DF	(Sweden) SWE	Joachim Björklund	12	0	11+1	0	0	0	0	0
17	DF	(England) ENG	Jody Craddock	31	1	30	1	0+1	0	0	0
18	DF	(England) ENG	Darren Williams	30	0	23+5	0	1	0	1	0
24	DF	(Northern Ireland) NIR	George McCartney	20	0	12+6	0	1	0	1	0
Midfielders:
4	MF	(United States) USA	Claudio Reyna	17	3	17	3	0	0	0	0
8	MF	(England) ENG	Gavin McCann	31	0	29	0	1	0	1	0
11	MF	(Republic of Ireland) IRL	Kevin Kilbane	30	2	24+4	2	0+1	0	1	0
16	MF	(Republic of Ireland) IRL	Jason McAteer	27	2	26	2	1	0	0	0
20	MF	(Sweden) SWE	Stefan Schwarz	20	1	18+2	1	0	0	0	0
21	MF	(England) ENG	Paul Thirlwell	16	0	11+3	0	1	0	1	0
26	MF	(Republic of Ireland) IRL	Thomas Butler	7	0	2+5	0	0	0	0	0
33	MF	(Argentina) ARG	Julio Arca	24	1	20+2	1	1	0	1	0
Forwards:
7	FW	(Cameroon) CMR	Patrick M'Boma	9	1	5+4	1	0	0	0	0
9	FW	(Republic of Ireland) IRL	Niall Quinn	39	6	24+14	6	1	0	0	0
10	FW	(England) ENG	Kevin Phillips	39	13	37	11	1	1	1	1
15	FW	(France) FRA	David Bellion	10	0	0+9	0	0	0	1	0
19	FW	(Scotland) SCO	Kevin Kyle	8	0	0+6	0	0+1	0	0+1	0
Players no longer with club:
4	MF	(Scotland) SCO	Don Hutchison	2	0	2	0	0	0	0	0
7	FW	(France) FRA	Lilian Laslandes	13	1	5+7	0	0	0	0+1	1
16	MF	(Scotland) SCO	Alex Rae	3	0	1+2	0	0	0	0	0
