= David Duke (disambiguation) =

David Duke (born 1950) is an American white supremacist and former politician.

David Duke may also refer to:

- David Duke (footballer) (born 1978), Scottish footballer
- David Duke Jr. (born 1999), American basketball player
- Dave Duke (born 1951), American basketball coach
- David Duke, the bass player for the band Vaginal Jesus

== See also ==
- David Dukes (1945–2000), American character actor
