= Richard Tracey (disambiguation) =

Richard Tracey (1943–2020) is a British politician

Richard Tracey or Richard Tracy may also refer to:

- Richard Tracey (footballer) (born 1979), English footballer
- Richard Tracey (judge) (1948–2019), Australian judge and military officer
- Richard Tracey (Royal Navy officer) (1837–1907), British naval officer
- Richard Tracy (died 1569), English lay Protestant reformer and Member of Parliament
