= Steve Soley =

English footballer

Personal information
- Date of birth: 22 April 1971 (age 55)
- Place of birth: Widnes, England
- Position: Midfielder

Senior career*
| Years | Team | Apps | (Gls) |
| 1995–1998 | Leek Town | | |
| 1998–1999 | Portsmouth | 78 | (10) |
| 1999 | → Macclesfield Town (loan) | 10 | (0) |
| 1999 | → Carlisle United (loan) | 3 | (1) |
| 1999–2002 | Carlisle United | 280 | (75) |
| 2002 | Southport | 19 | (7) |
| 2005 | Runcorn Linnets | | |
- * Club domestic league appearances and goals

Steve Soley (born 22 April 1971) is an English former footballer who played in the Football League, who was signed by Alan Ball. He played for Portsmouth, Macclesfield Town and Carlisle United.

== Career ==
Soley began his professional career at the age of 24 after he was signed from non-league Leek Town by Portsmouth in 1998. He establish himself at Portsmouth, after being signed by Alan Ball. He had loan spells at Macclesfield Town and Carlisle United before joining the latter on a permanent basis. After spending three years at Carlisle, he left to join Southport.
