= Steve Skinner =

English footballer

Personal information
- Full name: Stephen Karl Skinner
- Date of birth: 25 November 1981 (age 44)
- Place of birth: Carlisle, England
- Position: Forward

Team information
- Current team: West Auckland (Manager)

Senior career*
| Years | Team | Apps | (Gls) |
| 1999–2000 | Carlisle United | 2 | (0) |
| 2000–2001 | Queen of the South | 6 | (0) |
| 2001–2003 | Gretna | 27 | (5) |
| 2001 | → Carlisle United (loan) | 6 | (0) |
| 2003–2004 | Albion Rovers | 2 | (0) |
| 2005–2014 | Celtic Nation | ? | (6) |
| 2014 | West Auckland | 3 | (0) |
| 2014–2015 | Northallerton Town | 8 | (2) |

Managerial career
- 2014: Celtic Nation (Player/Manager)
- 2014–2015: Northallerton Town (Player/Manager)
- 2015: West Auckland (Manager)
- * Club domestic league appearances and goals

Steve Skinner (born 25 November 1981) is an English footballer who played in The Football League for Carlisle United. He also played for Scottish clubs Albion Rovers, Gretna and Queen of the South.

He is the former chairman of Celtic Nation, based in Carlisle. He resumed his playing career by joining West Auckland. In July 2014 Stephen bought Celtic Nation from American Owner Frank Lynch.

Skinner joined Northallerton Town, as player manager at the start of the 2014/15 season.

Return to West Auckland, as manager on 13 January 2015.
