= Matthew Pitts (footballer) =

English footballer

Personal information
- Date of birth: 25 December 1979 (age 46)
- Place of birth: Middlesbrough, England
- Positions: Defender; midfielder

Senior career*
Years	Team	Apps	(Gls)
1997–1999	Sunderland	0	(0)
1999–2000	Carlisle United	34	(1)
- Workington
- * Club domestic league appearances and goals

Matthew Pitts (born 25 December 1979) is an English footballer who started his career at Sunderland before he played in the Football League for Carlisle United and later joined Workington. He played either at right back or on the right side midfield.

== Career statistics ==
Appearances and goals by club, season and competition
Club	Season	League^{[A]}		FA Cup		League Cup		Other^{[B]}		Total	
Club	Season	Apps	Goals	Apps	Goals	Apps	Goals	Apps	Goals	Apps	Goals
Sunderland	1997–98	0	0	0	0	0	0	0	0	0	0
Sunderland	1998–99	0	0	0	0	0	0	0	0	0	0
Sunderland	Total	0	0	0	0	0	0	0	0	0	0
Carlisle United	1999–2000	29	1	0	0	2	0	2	1	33	2
Carlisle United	2000–01	5	0	0	0	2	0	0	0	7	0
Carlisle United	Total	34	1	0	0	4	0	2	1	40	2
Career total		34	1	0	0	4	0	2	1	40	2

A. The "League" column constitutes appearances and goals (including those as a substitute) in the Football League.
B. The "Other" column constitutes appearances and goals (including those as a substitute) in the Football League Trophy
