= Paul Harries =

Australian footballer

Personal information
- Date of birth: 19 October 1977 (age 49)
- Place of birth: Sydney, Australia
- Position: Forward

Youth career
- Wollongong Wolves
- NSWIS

Senior career*
Years	Team	Apps	(Gls)
- Lysaghts
1997–1998	Portsmouth	1	(0)
1998	→ Basingstoke Town (loan)		
1998–1999	Crystal Palace	0	(0)
1999	→ Torquay United (loan)	5	(0)
1999–2000	Carlisle United	20	(2)
2000–2001	Wollongong Wolves	6	(1)
2001–2002	Macclesfield Town	0	(0)
2002	Exeter City	1	(0)
2003–2004	Football Kingz	12	(1)
- * Club domestic league appearances and goals

Paul Harries (born 19 October 1977) is an Australian footballer who played professionally in England.

After playing youth football at Wollongong Wolves, Harries began his senior career with Lysaghts in the Illawarra Premier League, before moving to the NSW Institute of Sport.

In 1997, Harries signed a one-year contract with Portsmouth.

Harries joined Crystal Palace in September 1998 on a free transfer.

Crystal Palace sent Harries on loan to Torquay United in February 1999.

Harries signed for the Football Kingz in September 2003. He played 12 times for the Auckland team during the 2003–04 National Soccer League season.

Harries rejoined Wollongong Wolves ahead of the 2005 New South Wales Premier League season.
