= Richard Prokas =

English footballer

Personal information
- Full name: Richard Prokas
- Date of birth: 22 January 1976 (age 50)
- Place of birth: Penrith, England
- Height: 5 ft 9 in (1.75 m)
- Position: Midfielder

Senior career*
Years	Team	Apps	(Gls)
1994–2001	Carlisle United	204	(3)
1994–1995	Stalybridge Celtic (loan)	1	(0)
2001–2002	Cambridge United	12	(1)
2002–2003	Workington	?	(?)
2003–2005	Gretna	36	(0)
2006	Workington	?	(?)
Total		252	(4)

Managerial career
- 2008–2010: Penrith
- * Club domestic league appearances and goals

Richard Prokas (born 22 January 1976) is an English retired professional footballer who played as a midfielder for Cambridge United and Carlisle United in the Football League. He appeared in the famous Jimmy Glass game for Carlisle, in which the goalkeeper scored in the 94th minute to keep Carlisle United in the Football League. Prokas also gained notoriety in a third round FA Cup tie with Premier League club Arsenal in January 2001. Prokas carried out a two footed horror tackle on captain Patrick Vieira which split the Frenchman's shin pad. However Prokas escaped any punishment for the tackle.

== Honours ==
Carlisle United

- Football League Third Division: 1994–95
- Football League Trophy runner-up: 1994–95
