= Tom Peeters =

Belgian footballer

Personal information
- Date of birth: 25 September 1978 (age 47)
- Place of birth: Belgium
- Position: Midfielder

Senior career*
Years	Team	Apps	(Gls)
- Beerschot A.C.
199x-2000	K.V. Mechelen		
2000-2003	Sunderland A.F.C.	0	(0)
2001	Royal Antwerp F.C.→(loan)		
2003-2006	K.V. Mechelen		
2006-2007	K.S.V. Roeselare		
2007-2008	F.C.V. Dender E.H.		
2008-2009	Apollon Pontus		
2009	Pyrsos Grevena F.C.		
- * Club domestic league appearances and goals

Tom Peeters (born 25 September 1978 in Belgium) is a Belgian retired footballer who is last known to have played for Pyrsos Grevena in Greece.

== Career ==
Peeters started his senior career with Beerschot A.C. In 2000, he signed for Sunderland A.F.C. in the English Football League First Division, where he made one appearance and scored no goals. After that, he played for Belgian clubs Royal Antwerp, K.V. Mechelen, K.S.V. Roeselare, and F.C.V. Dender E.H., and Greek clubs Apollon Pontus and Pyrsos Grevena before retiring.
