= John Hore (footballer, born 1982) =

English footballer

Personal information
- Full name: John Stephen Hore
- Date of birth: 18 August 1982 (age 44)
- Place of birth: Liverpool, England
- Position: Forward

Senior career*
Years	Team	Apps	(Gls)
1999–2002	Carlisle United	5	(0)
2002–2004	Gretna	22	(8)
- Kettering Town
- * Club domestic league appearances and goals

John Stephen Hore (born 18 August 1982) is an English footballer who played in The Football League for Carlisle United.

After singing from Kettering Town, he played 11 games for Mossley, scoring twice, before he moved to Workington.
