= Richard Tracey (footballer) =

English footballer and manager (born 1979)

Personal information
- Full name: Richard Shaun Tracey
- Date of birth: 9 July 1979 (age 47)
- Place of birth: Dewsbury, England
- Position: Striker

Team information
- Current team: Emley (manager)

Youth career
- Sheffield United

Senior career*
Years	Team	Apps	(Gls)
1997–1998	Sheffield United	0	(0)
1998–1999	Rotherham United	3	(0)
1999	→ Carlisle United (loan)	2	(0)
1999–2000	Carlisle United	49	(11)
2001–2002	Macclesfield Town	33	(5)
2001	→ Gateshead (loan)	2	(2)
2002	Scarborough	1	(0)
2002–2003	Bradford Park Avenue		
2003–2004	Ossett Town		
2004	Frickley Athletic		
2008	Belper Town	61	(11)
2008–2010	Stocksbridge Park Steels		
2010–2011	Bradford Park Avenue		
2011–2017	Ossett Albion		

Managerial career
- 2013–2018: Ossett Albion
- 2019–: Emley
- * Club domestic league appearances and goals as of 16:08, 20 February 2007 (UTC)

Richard Tracey (born 9 July 1979) is an English former professional footballer. He is currently manager of Emley AFC and a teacher at St Wilfrid's Catholic High School & Sixth Form.

== Playing career ==
Tracey started his professional career at Sheffield United in 1997. On 5 March 1998 he moved to Rotherham United, where he made one start and four substitute appearances before joining Carlisle United, initially on loan, on 12 March 1999. Tracey appeared in the famous Jimmy Glass game against Plymouth Argyle, in which the goalkeeper scored in the 94th minute to keep Carlisle United in The Football League. Tracey went on to make 54 starts and 15 sub appearances for the Cumbrians, scoring 15 goals.

Tracey joined Macclesfield Town in January 2001 and played for the club 37 times, scoring five goals. On 8 March 2002 after falling out of favour with then manager David Moss, Tracey signed for Scarborough but made only one appearance in which he suffered a bad injury for the "Seadogs" before leaving the professional game and moving into semi-professional football.

Tracey played for several other non-league clubs, including Bradford Park Avenue and Ossett Town, and Ossett Albion.

== Managerial career ==
Tracey managed Ossett Albion between 2013 and 2018. He was then appointed manager of Emley in May 2019. Tracey's first season as Emley manager was curtailed due to the Covid pandemic in March 2020 with Emley sitting 4th and in the play off positions in the North West Counties League Division 1 North. The following season, Emley were transferred back to the Northern Counties East League Division 1 which was again curtailed due to the pandemic with Emley top of the table and unbeaten, due to the disrupted 2 seasons, promotion was gained due to PPG basis. Emley started the 2021–22 season in the Premier Division for the first time since 1988–89. In May 2023, Tracey managed Emley to Sheffield and Hallamshire Senior Cup glory, the first time Emley had won the cup in 25 years and the first trophy for the reformed Emley club. The following season, Tracey led Emley to the Northern Counties East League Premier Division title and led Emley to the Northern Premier League for the first time in 23 years and also the final of the NCEL league cup, where they lost to Parkgate 0-3 at Scunthorpe United’s Glanford Park.

In Emley's first season back in the NPL, Tracey led the Pewits to a 5th place finish which earned them a play off semi final but they lost 1–0 to Dunston, it was still Emley's highest finish for a generation, the 2024–25 season also saw Tracey's Emley reach the semi final of the Sheffield and Hallamshire Senior Cup where they were beaten 2–0 by eventual winners Worksop Town.

== Managerial Honours ==
- 2021-22 Northern Counties East Football League Division One- Promoted
- 2022-23 Sheffield and Hallamshire Senior Cup - Winners
- 2023-24 Northern Counties East Football League Premier Division- Champions/Promoted
- 2023-24 Northern Counties East Football League League Cup Final- Runners-Up

== Teaching career ==
Tracey has been a PE teacher at St Wilfrid's for many years. He is a Senior Leadership member and assistant headteacher, and has been head of year for multiple different year groups. He was promoted to assistant head in 2023 and organises the student Council groups within the school.
