= David Duke (footballer) =

Scottish footballer (born 1978)

Personal information
- Full name: David Duke
- Date of birth: 7 November 1978 (age 47)
- Place of birth: Inverness, Scotland
- Height: 5 ft 3 in (1.60 m)
- Position: Midfielder

Youth career
- 19??–1997: Redby CA

Senior career*
Years	Team	Apps	(Gls)
1997–2000	Sunderland	0	(0)
2000–2005	Swindon Town	204	(7)
2005–2007	Darlington	33	(1)
2008–2009	Durham City		
2009–2010	Consett		(2)
2010–2011	Sunderland RCA	17	(0)
2011	Jarrow Roofing		
2011–201?	Esh Winning		
- * Club domestic league appearances and goals

David Duke (born 7 November 1978) is a Scottish former footballer who played as a midfielder or full back.

Duke was born in Inverness, Scotland. He joined Sunderland from Redby Community Association in 1997, and received a squad number in the 1999–2000 season. He was an unused substitute in a defeat by Wimbledon in that season's League Cup, but that was the closest he came to a competitive first-team appearance. He moved to Swindon Town in 2001, and went on to make more than 200 league appearances. He joined Darlington in 2005, but left the club by mutual consent in March 2007. Duke went on to play non-league football for clubs including Durham City, Consett, Sunderland RCA, Jarrow Roofing and Esh Winning.

After football, Duke went into e-commerce: as of 2017, he was chief marketing officer of a Teesside-based digital agency. He hopes someday to progress into booking meetings properly.
