= Chris Porter (footballer, born 1979) =

English footballer (born 1979)

Personal information
- Full name: Christopher Ian Porter
- Date of birth: 10 November 1979 (age 46)
- Place of birth: Sunderland, England
- Height: 6 ft 2 in (1.88 m)
- Position: Goalkeeper

Youth career
- –1998: Sunderland

Senior career*
Years	Team	Apps	(Gls)
1998–2000	Sunderland	0	(0)
2000	Darlington	0	(0)
2000	Hartlepool United	0	(0)
2000–2001	Southend United	0	(0)
2001–2002	Leiftur Ólafsfjörður	15	(0)
2002–2003	Darlington	10	(0)
2003–2006	York City	64	(0)
2006	Bishop Auckland	19	(0)
2006–2007	Gateshead	0	(0)
2007–2009	Bishop Auckland	41	(0)
2009–2010	Billingham Synthonia	38	(0)
2010–2012	Gateshead	0	(0)
2012–	Darlington 1883	0	(0)
2012	→ Bishop Auckland (loan)	1	(0)
Total		188	(0)
- * Club domestic league appearances and goals

Christopher Ian Porter (born 10 November 1979) is an English former professional footballer who played as a goalkeeper in the Football League for Darlington and York City.

== Early life ==
Christopher Ian Porter was born on 10 November 1979 in Sunderland, Tyne and Wear.

== Career ==
Porter started his career with the Sunderland youth system and signed a professional contract on 1 August 1998. He left to play for Darlington from 7 March to 21 September 2000 as cover for Andy Collett. He joined Hartlepool United before leaving on 11 November to join Southend United. He played for them until the end of the 2000–01 season, leaving on 5 April 2001. He joined Icelandic team Leiftur Ólafsfjörður, leaving on 22 March 2002 and returned to Darlington on non-contract terms. He joined Third Division team York City on 30 July 2003. He signed a new deal with York City on 29 April 2004 following their relegation to the Conference National. He was released by York at the end of the 2005–06 season on 4 May 2006. Porter signed for Bishop Auckland at the start of the 2006–07 season, making 19 appearances before signing for Gateshead on 30 December 2006. Porter rejoined Bishop Auckland at the start of the 2007–08 season, making a further 50 total appearances. Porter joined Billingham Synthonia at the start of the 2009–10 season, making 50 appearances in all competitions and was named man of the match for his performance in the Durham Challenge Cup Final against Ryton before taking up the role of goalkeeping coach at Gateshead. In November 2010, Porter was named on the bench by Gateshead for the matches against Tamworth and Forest Green Rovers due to an injury to Tim Deasy, and was again named on the bench for the opening game of the 2011–12 season on 13 August against Kidderminster Harriers while Deasy was suspended.

Porter re-signed for Darlington on 22 June 2012, however on 25 June despite signing with the previous entity of the football club his registration was changed to the new Darlington 1883 side after the club was liquidated and reformed. He made his debut on 18 September 2012 in a Durham Challenge Cup game against Hebburn Town, being sent off after 15 minutes. Porter joined former club Bishop Auckland on loan in October 2012, playing one game against Marske United.

== Career statistics ==
Appearances and goals by club, season and competition
Club	Season	League^{[A]}		FA Cup		League Cup		Other^{[B]}		Total	
Club	Season	Apps	Goals	Apps	Goals	Apps	Goals	Apps	Goals	Apps	Goals
Sunderland	1998–99	0	0	0	0	0	0	0	0	0	0
Sunderland	1999–2000	0	0	0	0	0	0	0	0	0	0
Darlington	1999–2000	0	0	0	0	0	0	0	0	0	0
Darlington	2000–01	0	0	0	0	0	0	0	0	0	0
Hartlepool United	2000–01	0	0	0	0	0	0	0	0	0	0
Southend United	2000–01	0	0	0	0	0	0	0	0	0	0
Leiftur Ólafsfjörður	2001	15	0	0	0	0	0	0	0	15	0
Darlington	2001–02	7	0	0	0	0	0	0	0	7	0
Darlington	2002–03	3	0	2	0	0	0	0	0	5	0
Darlington	Total	10	0	2	0	0	0	0	0	12	0
York City	2003–04	5	0	0	0	0	0	0	0	5	0
York City	2004–05	18	0	0	0	0	0	2	0	20	0
York City	2005–06	41	0	2	0	0	0	1	0	44	0
York City	Total	64	0	2	0	0	0	3	0	69	0
Bishop Auckland	2006–07	19	0	0	0	0	0	0	0	19	0
Gateshead	2006–07	0	0	0	0	0	0	0	0	0	0
Bishop Auckland	2007–08	26	0	2	0	0	0	3	0	31	0
Bishop Auckland	2008–09	15	0	2	0	0	0	2	0	19	0
Bishop Auckland	Total	41	0	4	0	0	0	5	0	50	0
Billingham Synthonia	2009–10	33	0	3	0	0	0	7	0	43	0
Billingham Synthonia	2010–11	5	0	1	0	0	0	2	0	8	0
Billingham Synthonia	Total	38	0	4	0	0	0	9	0	51	0
Gateshead	2010–11	0	0	0	0	0	0	0	0	0	0
Gateshead	2011–12	0	0	0	0	0	0	0	0	0	0
Gateshead	Total	0	0	0	0	0	0	0	0	0	0
Darlington 1883	2012–13	0	0	0	0	0	0	1	0	1	0
Bishop Auckland (loan)	2012–13	1	0	0	0	0	0	0	0	1	0
Career total		188	0	12	0	0	0	18	0	218	0

A. The "League" column constitutes appearances (including those as a substitute) in the Football League, Football Conference, Northern League and 1. deild karla.
B. The "Other" column constitutes appearances (including those as a substitute) in the Conference League Cup, Durham Challenge Cup, FA Trophy, FA Vase and Northern League Cup.
