= John Oster =

Footballer (born 1978)

Personal information
- Full name: John Morgan Oster
- Date of birth: 8 December 1978 (age 47)
- Place of birth: Boston, Lincolnshire, England
- Height: 5 ft 9 in (1.75 m)
- Positions: Winger; central midfielder

Youth career
- 1992–1994: Grimsby Town

Senior career*
Years	Team	Apps	(Gls)
1994–1997	Grimsby Town	24	(3)
1997–1999	Everton	40	(1)
1999–2005	Sunderland	68	(5)
2001	→ Barnsley (loan)	2	(0)
2002	→ Grimsby Town (loan)	10	(5)
2003	→ Grimsby Town (loan)	7	(1)
2004–2005	→ Leeds United (loan)	8	(1)
2005	Burnley	15	(1)
2005–2008	Reading	76	(2)
2008–2009	Crystal Palace	31	(3)
2009–2012	Doncaster Rovers	111	(2)
2012–2013	Barnet	28	(2)
2013–2015	Gateshead	67	(3)
Total		487	(29)

International career
1996	Wales U18	3	(0)
1996–1998	Wales U21	8	(0)
1999	Wales B	1	(0)
1997–2004	Wales	13	(0)
- * Club domestic league appearances and goals

John Morgan Oster (born 8 December 1978) is an English football coach and former professional player who played as a midfielder.

Oster was a product of the youth team at Grimsby Town where he was added to the first team squad in 1994, however he didn't make his debut until the 1996–97 season. His performances that season caught the eye of Premier League side Everton who paid £1.5 million for him during the summer of 1997. Two years later he was sold to Sunderland where he remained until 2005. Whilst with The Black Cats he spent time on loan with Barnsley before returning to Grimsby for two separate loan spells during the 2002–03 season, in his time back at Blundell Park he was unable to save the club from relegation. He later moved on loan to Leeds United before joining Burnley permanently. His stay with Burnley was brief and he moved to Reading where he helped them earn promotion to the Premier League for the first time. In 2008 he moved to Crystal Palace where he remained for a year before transferring to Doncaster Rovers. He departed Rovers in the summer of 2012 and joined League Two side Barnet. Prior to his move to the North London club he had played his entire professional football career inside the top two divisions of English football. He joined Gateshead in September 2013.

Born in England, Oster represented Wales at international level, where he earned 13 caps between 1997 and 2004. He was renowned for his excellent first touch and wide range of passing. He was often deployed on the wing, but played as a deep-lying playmaker later in his career.

== Club career ==
=== Grimsby Town ===
Oster started his career at Grimsby Town and had progressed through the youth ranks at the club and was inducted into the first team in the same youth squad as players such as Danny Butterfield, Matthew Bloomer and Daryl Clare. He was promoted to the first team scene in the 1994–95 season when the club were in the old First Division. However, he didn't make his debut until the 1996–97 campaign where he made his debut in a 3–1 win away at Charlton Athletic on 26 November 1996. Following Grimsby's relegation from the First Division, Oster was sold by The Mariners, for a fee of £1.5 million that saw him break the club's record transfer sale that was initially held by Gary Croft following his move to Blackburn Rovers for £1 million a year earlier. He had only played twenty-six times in all competitions, scoring four goals upon his departure.

=== Everton ===
The Mariners sold Oster to Everton for £1.5 million in 1997, aged only 18 and having played only 25 matches. It transpired that he had made the wrong move though, as he was rarely utilised in his favoured winger's role, in a 4–4–2 formation. Oster scored three times during his spell at Everton; once in the league against Barnsley, once in the League Cup against Scunthorpe United and once in the FA Cup against Coventry City.

=== Sunderland ===
Oster moved to Sunderland for a fee in excess of £1 million, but again failed to find regular form. His low point at the club was when he was involved in an incident that ended the career of reserve player Mark Maley by accidentally shooting him in the eye with an air rifle. While at Sunderland, during the 2002–2003 season, he spent five months back on loan with his former club Grimsby Town. He enjoyed two fruitful and productive spells with the club during that season, but despite this his goals and performances could not save The Mariners from relegation, as the club struggled to stop a slide down the Football League ladder. Oster was released by Sunderland in January 2005, shortly after returning to the Black Cats in disgrace from a loan at Leeds United, where he scored once against Millwall. There was little doubt that Grimsby would have liked Oster back but could not afford him and their financial position and reduced league status made it an unattractive option for the player.

=== Burnley ===
Following a short spell at Burnley, where he scored once against Coventry, Oster joined Reading on 2 August 2005.

=== Reading ===
Oster made his debut for Reading against Brighton & Hove Albion on 9 August 2005 as a substitute. In January 2007, he extended his contract at the Madejski Stadium until the summer of 2008. He notched his first Premier League goal in nearly 10 years against Middlesbrough at the Riverside Stadium where the Royals were defeated for the first time in 2007, 2–1. After a couple of years as a squad player with the Royals, including a number of Premier League sub appearances, he was released by Reading following their relegation from the Premier League, on 16 May 2008.

=== Crystal Palace ===
Before signing for Crystal Palace, Oster had a trial spell at Championship rivals Derby County. Oster signed an initial six-month contract for Crystal Palace on 11 August 2008, which was extended by a further 18 months. He scored on his debut against Hereford United in the League Cup.

=== Doncaster Rovers ===
Oster left Crystal Palace in the summer and joined Doncaster Rovers on a six-month contract. Oster made his Doncaster debut on 8 August 2009, coming on as a second-half substitute against Watford. He extended his contract in January 2010 to keep him at the club until the end of the 2009–10 season. He scored his first goal for Doncaster against Peterborough United on 16 March 2010.

Due to his impressive form in the 2009–10 season, Rovers offered Oster the opportunity to renew his contract with the club. Oster agreed and committed to Doncaster for a further two years. Oster was an ever present for Doncaster in the 2010–11 season after topping the Rovers' appearance chart in mid April with 38 starts. In May 2012, Oster was released by the club after the expiry of his contract.

=== Barnet ===
On 7 September 2012, Oster signed for Football League Two club Barnet. On 19 October 2012, he scored his first goal for Barnet, scoring the third goal in a 4–0 win against Northampton Town. Oster was released by manager Edgar Davids at the end of the season following Barnet's relegation from League Two.

=== Gateshead ===
On 20 September 2013, Oster signed for Conference Premier club Gateshead on non-contract terms, the move being his first into Non-league. He made his debut the following day as a second-half substitute against Tamworth. He scored his first goal for Gateshead on 21 December 2013 in a 4–2 defeat at Luton Town.

== International career ==
Oster made his debut for Wales as an 18-year-old in 1997, coming on as an injury-time substitute for Robbie Savage in a World Cup qualifying defeat in Belgium. Oster played intermittently for the national side between 1997 and 2004, accumulating 13 caps, though only six of these came in competitive games. Oster did not play in any games under John Toshack following his appointment in November 2004, his last cap for Wales being the 2–2 draw with Northern Ireland in 2004 under previous boss Mark Hughes.

== Coaching career ==
In September 2019, Oster was appointed as assistant manager of Whickham under manager Matty Pattison. The duo resigned from their position on 1 February 2020.

== Personal life ==
In April 2002 whilst at Sunderland, Oster accidentally shot reserve team player Mark Maley with an air-gun. Neither of the pair believed the gun was loaded and Maley had to undergo an eye operation. Whilst on loan at Leeds United in December 2004 Oster and Jamie McMaster were suspended by the club for misbehaving at the club's Christmas party. The incident spelled the end of his Leeds career and his loan was terminated. In 2005 his Sunderland contract was terminated after he was arrested for assault outside a Durham nightclub.

== Career statistics ==
=== Club ===
Appearances and goals by club, season and competition
Club	Season	League			Cup (Note: Includes FA Cup, League Cup, FA Community Shield and FA Trophy)		Play-offs		Total	
Club	Season	Division	Apps	Goals	Apps	Goals	Apps	Goals	Apps	Goals
Grimsby Town	1996–97	First Division	24	3	1	1	–		25	4
Everton	1997–98	Premier League	31	1	4	1	–		35	2
Everton	1998–99	Premier League	9	0	5	1	–		14	1
Everton	Total		40	1	9	2	0	0	49	3
Sunderland	1999–2000	Premier League	10	0	3	0	–		13	0
Sunderland	2000–01	Premier League	8	0	6	1	–		14	1
Sunderland	2001–02	Premier League	0	0	0	0	–		0	0
Sunderland	2002–03	Premier League	3	0	2	0	–		5	0
Sunderland	2003–04	First Division	38	5	8	0	2	0	48	5
Sunderland	2004–05	First Division	9	0	2	0	–		11	0
Total		68	5	21	1	2	0	61	5	
Barnsley (loan)	2001–02	First Division	2	0	0	0	–		2	0
Grimsby Town (loan)	2002–03	First Division	17	6	0	0	–		17	6
Leeds United (loan)	2004–05	Championship	8	1	0	0	–		8	0
Burnley	2004–05	Championship	15	1	3	0	–		18	1
Reading	2005–06	Championship	33	1	8	1	–		41	2
Reading	2006–07	Premier League	25	1	6	0	–		31	1
Reading	2007–08	Premier League	18	0	0	0	–		18	0
Reading	Total		76	2	14	1	0	0	90	3
Crystal Palace	2008–09	Championship	31	3	2	1	–		33	4
Doncaster Rovers	2009–10	Championship	40	1	4	0	–		44	1
Doncaster Rovers	2010–11	Championship	41	0	2	0	–		43	0
Doncaster Rovers	2011–12	Championship	30	1	3	0	–		33	1
Doncaster Rovers	Total		111	2	9	0	0	0	120	2
Barnet	2012–13	League Two	28	2	0	0	–		28	2
Gateshead	2013–14	Conference Premier	32	2	4	0	3	0	39	2
Gateshead	2014–15	Conference Premier	35	1	4	0	5	0	44	1
Gateshead	Total		67	3	8	0	8	0	83	3
Career total			487	29	68	6	10	0	565	35

=== International ===
Appearances and goals by national team and year
National team	Year	Apps	Goals
Wales	1997	2	0
Wales	1998	1	0
Wales	1999	1	0
Wales	2000	0	0
Wales	2001	0	0
Wales	2002	0	0
Wales	2003	4	0
Wales	2004	5	0
Total		13	0

== Honours ==
Reading

- Football League Championship: 2005–06

Individual

- Grimsby Town Supporters' Young Player of the Year: 1997
