= Darren Holloway =

English footballer

Personal information
- Date of birth: 3 October 1977 (age 49)
- Place of birth: Bishop Auckland, England
- Height: 6 ft 0 in (1.83 m)
- Position: Defender

Senior career*
Years	Team	Apps	(Gls)
1995–2000	Sunderland	61	(0)
1997	→ Carlisle United (loan)	5	(0)
1999–2000	→ Bolton Wanderers (loan)	4	(0)
2000–2004	Wimbledon	92	(0)
2004	→ Scunthorpe United (loan)	5	(1)
2004–2006	Bradford City	57	(1)
2006–2007	Darlington	21	(1)
2008–2009	Gateshead	10	(0)
Total		255	(3)
- * Club domestic league appearances and goals as of 20:35, 14 March 2009 (UTC)

Darren Holloway (born 3 October 1977 in Bishop Auckland, England) is a retired professional footballer.

== Playing career ==
Holloway began his playing career with Sunderland and played 70 times in all competitions for the club, which included 20 appearances in the Premier League.

He left Sunderland in 2000 signing for Wimbledon for a reported fee of £1 million. Holloway left the club in 2004 following the relocation of Wimbledon F.C. to Milton Keynes and signed for Bradford City. He made 57 league appearances for Bradford and scored once in a 1–0 away win against Hull City.

Holloway would later go on to play for Darlington who he scored for once against Lincoln City. In October 2008, he joined Gateshead, having been out of the game since he was released by Darlington at the end of the 2006–07 season. He was released by Gateshead after the 2008–09 season.

After leaving Gateshead, Holloway retired from football due to a persistent knee injury.

== Coaching career ==
From 2016 to 2019, Holloway was assistant manager at Blyth Spartans working alongside Alun Armstrong. On 19 July 2019, he was appointed as assistant manager at his former club Darlington working again with Alun Armstrong. In September 2023, after a poor start to the season, both Holloway and Armstrong left the club.

== Personal life ==
In January 2026, Holloway pleaded guilty to two counts of child ill-treatment and neglect. He received an 18-month prison sentence for both offences which was suspended for 24 months. Holloway was also ordered to complete 240 hours of unpaid work and attend up to 35 rehabilitation activity days during the next year.
