= Luke Weaver (footballer) =

English footballer (born 1979)

Personal information
- Date of birth: 26 June 1979 (age 47)
- Place of birth: Woolwich, England
- Position: Goalkeeper

Youth career
- Leyton Orient

Senior career*
Years	Team	Apps	(Gls)
1996–1998	Leyton Orient	9	(0)
1998–1999	Sunderland	0	(0)
1998–1999	→ Scarborough (loan)	6	(0)
1999	→ Carlisle United (loan)	6	(0)
1999–2003	Carlisle United	47	(0)
2003–2004	Northampton Town	0	(0)
Total		68	(0)
- * Club domestic league appearances and goals

Luke Weaver (born 26 June 1979) is an English former professional footballer.

Weaver started playing football at eight years old as a central defender for Ridgeway Rovers F.C but was soon put in goal where he showed natural flair and talent. Weaver was talented at other sports such as cricket and basketball, where he was also called up for county trials which he had to turn down due to football commitments. Weaver was selected to play in goal for Middlesex County and at just 13 years old was called up for England school boy trials where he was selected as first choice keeper. Weaver was first choice keeper for England school boys up to Under-21s.

Weaver signed as a trainee at Leyton Orient F.C and turned professional with them at just 17 years old. At Leyton Orient F.C he had a loan spell at West Ham United and Leyton Orient F.C eventually struck a deal with Sunderland A.F.C on 1 July 1998 where Weaver was sold for £250,000.

Weaver impressed Peter Reid as a young and upcoming goalkeeper, but was unable to break through into consistent first team football at Sunderland due to a string of injuries. Weaver eventually went on loan to Carlisle United on 5 August 1999 and this became a permanent four-year contract on 7 September 1999.

Weaver made his debut for Carlisle United in the first game of the 99/00 season. In one of those frequent twists in football it was to be a home game against the club where he had turned professional, Leyton Orient F.C. Weaver's natural ability (still being a young goal keeper) shone through and he was building a fine reputation as a solid shot stopper. He was voted United's Player of the season 99/00.

Throughout Weaver's career he was blighted by injuries such as several knee injuries that required surgery and a broken jaw that required metal plates to be inserted. In 2003, Weaver went on loan to Northampton where he retired from the game.
