= Mark Maley =

English footballer (born 1981)

Personal information
- Full name: Mark Maley
- Date of birth: 26 January 1981 (age 45)
- Place of birth: Newcastle upon Tyne, England
- Position: Full back

Youth career
- Wallsend Boys Club

Senior career*
Years	Team	Apps	(Gls)
1998–2002	Sunderland	0	(0)
2000	→ Blackpool (loan)	2	(0)
2000	→ Northampton Town (loan)	2	(0)
2001–2002	→ York City (loan)	13	(0)
Total		17	(0)

International career
- England schoolboys
- England U18
- * Club domestic league appearances and goals

Mark Maley (born 26 January 1981) is an English former footballer who played as a defender.

Maley started his career with Sunderland and progressed through the youth system at the club. He was loaned out to lower-league sides Blackpool, Northampton Town and York City, making a number of appearances in the Football League. His career was brought to an end after accidentally being shot in the eye by Sunderland teammate John Oster with an air gun in 2002. After leaving football, Maley earned a degree in corrosion engineering and established a firm specialising in inspecting offshore oil rigs using drones.

== Club career ==
Maley was born in Newcastle upon Tyne, Tyne and Wear and started his footballing career with Sunderland after progressing through their youth system. He made his first team debut after starting at right back in a League Cup first round second leg game against York City on 18 August 1998, which Sunderland won 2–1. This proved to be his only appearance of the 1998–99 season. He made another appearance in this competition the following season, starting in a 3–2 victory over Walsall, before being substituted for Michael Gray on 80 minutes. His third, and eventually final appearance for Sunderland came in a 3–0 victory over Luton Town in a second round League Cup tie on 19 September 2000. Less than a month later, he was loaned out to Third Division team Blackpool for a month. His debut came in a 2–2 draw with Southend United in a Football League game on 8 October and made one further appearance in a 2–0 defeat to Plymouth Argyle. He was soon sent out on loan again, joining Northampton Town for a month, and again made two appearances, featuring in defeats to Walsall and Swindon Town.

He joined York City on an initial month's loan on 27 September 2001, which materialised as part of an agreement between the two clubs, with Sunderland loaning some players out to York. He made his debut two days later, playing at left back in a 3–1 victory over Lincoln City. The loan was extended for a second month in November and hinted he may have been interested in signing for the club permanently. He was handed the first red card of his career in a 2–0 defeat to Scunthorpe United. He suffered from a knee injury during an FA Cup tie against Colchester United on 17 November, which led to him undergoing a late fitness test for their game against Swansea City, and was able to play, entering the game as a substitute. The loan was extended for a third month on 22 November. It was extended until the end of the 2001–02 season on 18 December, but he was forced to return to Sunderland in March 2002 after suffering from a thigh injury. He finished his spell at the club with 17 appearances in all competitions.

He was accidentally shot in the eye by Sunderland teammate John Oster with an air gun at Oster's home in April 2002, with neither believing the gun was loaded, which resulted in Maley undergoing emergency surgery. This led to Maley's career being brought to an end at the age of 21. The pair came to an out-of-court settlement over the incident in February 2007.

== International career ==
Maley was an England schoolboy international and captained the England under-18 team.
