= 1991–92 Southampton F.C. season =

Southampton F.C.
1991–92 season
- Chairman: Guy Askham
- Manager: Ian Branfoot
- Stadium: The Dell
- First Division: 16th
- FA Cup: Sixth round
- League Cup: Fourth round
- Full Members' Cup: Runners-up
- Top goalscorer: League: Alan Shearer (13); All: Alan Shearer (19)
- Highest home attendance: 19,264 v Manchester; United (14 September 1991)
- Lowest home attendance: 4,036 v Scarborough (9 October 1991)
- Average home league attendance: 14,070
- Biggest win: 2–0 (two matches); 3–1 (three matches)
- Biggest defeat: 0–4 v Leeds United (28 August 1991); 0–4 v Arsenal (28 September 1991); 1–5 v Arsenal (2 May 1992)
Home colours	Away colours	Third colours

The 1991–92 Southampton F.C. season was the club's 91st season of competitive football and their 22nd in the First Division of the Football League. The season was Southampton's first with manager Ian Branfoot, who replaced Chris Nicholl in the summer after six years. It was a disappointing year for the club, who finished 16th in the league after spending much of the year in the relegation zone. Outside the league, the club reached the sixth round of the FA Cup for the first time since 1986, were knocked out of the League Cup in the fourth round, and finished as runners-up of the final Full Members' Cup.

With Nicholl's departure came a busy transfer period, as players including brothers Ray and Rod Wallace, Jimmy Case, Steve Davis and Paul Rideout all left the club. New signings included Paul Moody, Iain Dowie, Terry Hurlock and Stuart Gray. The Saints started their first season with Branfoot on dreadful form, dropping into the relegation zone almost immediately and falling to the very bottom of the table by the end of 1991. However, a run of six consecutive wins starting in March (their joint-longest run of consecutive league wins since 1964) saw the team make progress towards mid-table, as they reached a season-high of 13th before settling three positions lower. This was the club's lowest First Division finish since their last relegation from the top flight in 1974.

In the FA Cup, Southampton reached the sixth round for the first time since the 1985–86 season, eliminating First Division rivals Queens Park Rangers and Manchester United, then Third Division side Bolton Wanderers, in the process. They were knocked out after a replay by another top-flight side, Norwich City. In the League Cup, the club made it past Scarborough of the Fourth Division and First Division high-flyers Sheffield Wednesday, before facing elimination at the hands of Nottingham Forest in the fourth round. In the Full Members' Cup – the last before the tournament was discontinued – the Saints beat Second Division sides Bristol City and Plymouth Argyle, then league rivals Chelsea, before losing in their first and only final appearance to Nottingham Forest.

Southampton used 29 players during the 1991–92 season and had 12 different goalscorers. In his final season with the club, Alan Shearer finished as the top scorer for the Saints, with 19 goals in all competitions. Matt Le Tissier was second with 15 goals, followed by Iain Dowie on nine. Shearer and goalkeeper Tim Flowers made the most appearances during the campaign, playing in 59 of Southampton's 61 games across all competitions. Flowers received the Southampton F.C. Player of the Season award for the first time. The average league attendance at The Dell during 1991–92 was 14,070. The highest attendance was 19,264 against Manchester United in September and the lowest was 4,036 against Scarborough in the League Cup in October.

== Background and transfers ==
At the end of the 1990–91 season, manager Chris Nicholl was sacked by Southampton's board after six seasons in charge. In his first two seasons as manager, the Saints had reached the semi-finals of the FA Cup and the League Cup, respectively; however, during his tenure, Nicholl had only managed to lead the club to one top-half finishing position in the First Division. He was also credited for giving debuts to several successful players at a young age, including Matt Le Tissier, Alan Shearer, Francis Benali, and brothers Ray and Rod Wallace. Nicholl was replaced in the summer of 1991 by Ian Branfoot, who had previously worked as a coach at Southampton between 1977 and 1983, before having a successful five-year spell as manager of Reading in the Second and Third Divisions.

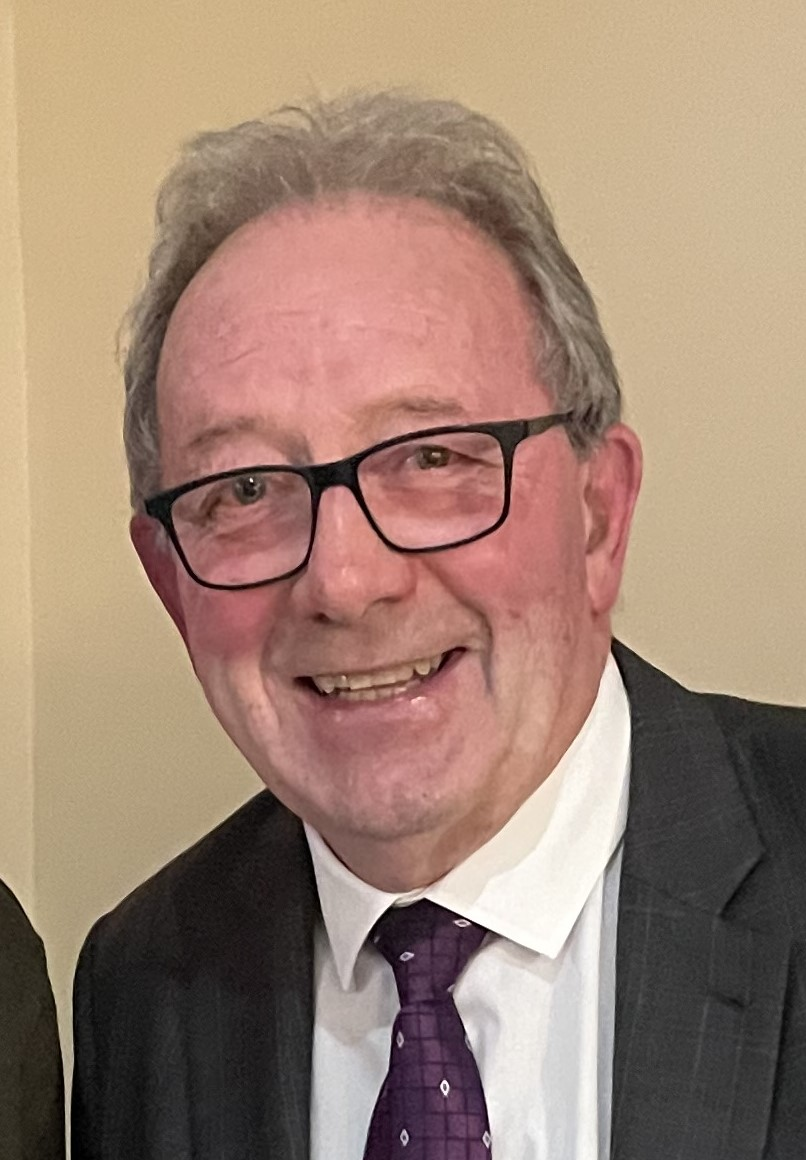
New manager Ian Branfoot controversially released Jimmy Case on a free transfer shortly after arriving at the club.

Ahead of Branfoot's arrival, brothers Ray and Rod Wallace both left Southampton, after having unsuccessfully requested transfers several times during the previous season. They were sold for a combined £1.6 million – the highest fee set by a tribunal to date – to First Division title challengers Leeds United. The new manager's first transfer activity saw him release 37-year-old midfielder Jimmy Case on a free transfer to Bournemouth in the Third Division. In dismissing a player described by club historians as "a favourite of the fans", this decision has been identified by commentators as one of the primary early reasons for the supporters' disapproval of Branfoot as manager. Just two new players joined ahead of the start of the league campaign – striker Paul Moody was signed from Southern League side Waterlooville and left-back Matthew Robinson was signed as a trainee. Centre-back Steve Davis, who had struggled to break into Southampton's first team, also left in August to join Fourth Division side and former loan club Burnley.

After the opening three league games of the season, Branfoot signed winger David Lee from Third Division side Bury for £350,000. He was followed just over a week later by Northern Irish striker and former Southampton schoolboy Iain Dowie, who joined from West Ham United on 3 September for a fee of £500,000. Another week later, Branfoot signed former Reading acquisition Terry Hurlock from Scottish champions Rangers as a replacement for Case, paying £400,000 for his services. Later in September, the club sold striker Paul Rideout to Notts County for £250,000, left-back Andy Cook to Exeter City for £60,000, and midfielder Sergey Gotsmanov (who had only arrived a year before) to German club Hallescher FC for free. Defensive midfielder Stuart Gray signed for £200,000 from Aston Villa, who then briefly signed Alan McLoughlin on loan.

Transfer activity continued throughout much of the 1991–92 season. At the beginning of October, the club brought in centre-back Steve Wood – another key player in Branfoot's promotion-winning Reading side from 1986 – from second-flight side Millwall for a fee of £400,000. At the same time, fellow centre-back Russell Osman was loaned to Bristol City in the Second Division; he would later make his move permanent in December, for a fee of £60,000. In the second half of the campaign, Kevin Moore, Jon Gittens and Paul Tisdale were all sent out on loans until the end of the season, while McLoughlin was loaned out (and subsequently sold) to nearby rivals Portsmouth. During the latter stages of the season, Barbadian winger Michael Gilkes was loaned in from Reading, where he had played under Branfoot during his tenure as manager.

Players transferred in

Name	Nationality	Pos.	Club	Date	Fee	Ref.
Paul Moody	England	FW	(England) Waterlooville	July 1991	Unknown	
Matthew Robinson	England	DF	none (free agent)	July 1991	Free (Note: Matthew Robinson initially signed as a trainee in July 1991, before turning professional in July 1993.)	
David Lee	England	MF	(England) Bury	26 August 1991	£350,000	
Iain Dowie	Northern Ireland	FW	(England) West Ham United	3 September 1991	£500,000	
Terry Hurlock	England	MF	(Scotland) Rangers	9 September 1991	£400,000	
Stuart Gray	England	MF	(England) Aston Villa	September 1991	£200,000	
Steve Wood	England	DF	(England) Millwall	October 1991	£400,000	
Andy Williams	Wales	DF	none (free agent)	January 1992	Free (Note: Andy Williams initially signed as an associate schoolboy in January 1992, before becoming a trainee in July 1994 and turning professional in May 1996.)	

Players transferred out

Name	Nationality	Pos.	Club	Date	Fee	Ref.
Ray Wallace	England	DF	(England) Leeds United	May 1991	£1,600,000	
Rod Wallace	England	FW	(England) Leeds United	May 1991	£1,600,000	
Jimmy Case	England	MF	(England) Bournemouth	June 1991	Free	
Steve Davis	England	DF	(England) Burnley	August 1991	£60,000	
Paul Rideout	England	FW	(England) Notts County	16 September 1991	£250,000	
Andy Cook	England	DF	(England) Exeter City	September 1991	£60,000	
Sergey Gotsmanov	Soviet Union	MF	(Germany) Hallescher FC	September 1991	Free	
Russell Osman	England	DF	(England) Bristol City	December 1991	£60,000	
Alan McLoughlin	Republic of Ireland	MF	(England) Portsmouth	March 1992	Unknown	

Players loaned in

Name	Nationality	Pos.	Club	Date from	Date to	Ref.
Michael Gilkes	Barbados	MF	(England) Reading	March 1992	End of season	

Players loaned out

Name	Nationality	Pos.	Club	Date from	Date to	Ref.
Alan McLoughlin	Republic of Ireland	MF	(England) Aston Villa	September 1991	October 1991	
Tommy Widdrington	England	MF	(England) Wigan Athletic	September 1991	October 1991	
Russell Osman	England	DF	(England) Bristol City	October 1991	December 1991	
Kevin Moore	England	DF	(England) Bristol Rovers	January 1992	End of season	
Jon Gittens	England	MF	(England) Middlesbrough	February 1992	End of season	
Alan McLoughlin	Republic of Ireland	MF	(England) Portsmouth	February 1992	March 1992	
Paul Tisdale	England	MF	(England) Northampton Town	March 1992	End of season	

== Pre-season friendlies ==
Ahead of the 1991–92 league campaign, Southampton played nine pre-season friendlies. The pre-season period started in July with five straight wins, as the Saints beat a Kuwait Olympic XI 5–0, Third Division side Exeter City 3–0, South Western League club Torpoint Athletic 5–3, Plymouth Argyle of the Second Division 2–1, and another South Western League side, Bodmin Town, 5–0 (the final match saw Alan Shearer score a hat-trick). August started with two games against Scottish opposition, as the club drew 0–0 with St Johnstone and picked up a 2-0 victory over First Division champions Falkirk. The final two pre-season friendlies included a 4–1 win over Bournemouth for Brian Tiler's testimonial and their only loss, a 0–1 defeat at home to Spanish side Real Sociedad.

24 July 1991 Friendly	Southampton	5–0	Kuwait Olympic XI	Southampton
	Hall; Le Tissier; Rideout; Shearer			Stadium: Road-Sea Park

26 July 1991 Friendly	Exeter City	0–3	Southampton	Exeter
			McLoughlin; Moore; Rideout	Stadium: St James Park

27 July 1991 Friendly	Torpoint Athletic	3–5	Southampton	Torpoint
			Maddison; Hall; Moody; Rideout	Stadium: The Mill

29 July 1991 Friendly	Plymouth Argyle	1–2	Southampton	Plymouth
			Cockerill; Shearer	Stadium: Home Park

30 July 1991 Friendly	Bodmin Town	0–5	Southampton	Bodmin
			Shearer; Cockerill; Ruddock	Stadium: Priory Park

2 August 1991 Friendly	St Johnstone	0–0	Southampton	Perth, Scotland
				Stadium: McDiarmid Park

4 August 1991 Friendly	Falkirk	0–2	Southampton	Falkirk, Scotland
			Shearer	Stadium: Brockville Park

6 August 1991 Brian Tiler Memorial	Bournemouth	1–4	Southampton	Bournemouth
			Cockerill; Osman; Shearer	Stadium: Dean Court

9 August 1991 Friendly	Southampton	0–1	Real Sociedad	Southampton
				Stadium: The Dell

== First Division ==
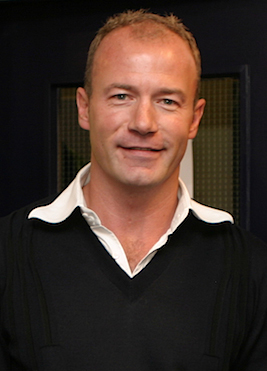
Alan Shearer took over as Southampton's main goalscorer in the 1991–92 season, which would be his final year before moving to Blackburn Rovers.

Ian Branfoot's debut season with Southampton started poorly, as they faced two marginal defeats in their opening fixtures, losing 2–3 at home to Tottenham Hotspur and 0–1 at Notts County, who had recently been promoted from the Second Division. Their first win came in a 2–0 away victory over Sheffield United, however this was followed by a 0–4 defeat (the joint-heaviest of the season) at home to Leeds United and another three games spawning just two points. A 1–0 win over Wimbledon was a brief high point followed by another two losses, the second of which saw Arsenal emulating Leeds United's 4–0 thrashing of the Saints, with Ian Wright netting a hat-trick. By the end of September, Southampton had already dropped to 21st out of 22 in the First Division league table. An undefeated October saw the South Coast side draw 1–1 with Oldham Athletic and 0–0 with Norwich City, before picking up an unexpected 3–1 away win at Nottingham Forest, with Matt Le Tissier scoring his first double of the season.

Southampton remained in the relegation zone throughout most of the rest of the calendar year, only briefly pulling themselves out with a 1–0 win over Chelsea in late-November. Despite their poor run of results, the Saints did manage to hold their own against several high-profile opponents during this period, including holding Liverpool to a 1–1 draw and sharing the points with title hopefuls Leeds United in a 3–3 stalemate either side of Christmas. After an 11th defeat from their opening 22 games, however, the club ended December at the bottom of the league table with just 19 points. 1992 started in much the same manner, as the Saints lost two home games in a row – the first to Everton and the second to Sheffield United, who were also fighting against the risk of relegation. An away win over Tottenham Hotspur saw Southampton briefly leapfrog Luton Town at the bottom of the table, however they quickly returned their after another loss at Norwich City followed by three draws in a row against Chelsea, Coventry City and Liverpool.

Despite being at the bottom of the league table, Southampton embarked on a winning streak in March which saw them pick up six victories in a row – the first time they had done so since the early stages of the 1964–65 season. The games were all closely fought, with the Saints beating fellow strugglers West Ham United, mid-table side Crystal Palace and title contenders Manchester City 1–0 in the first three fixtures, which were followed by a late 2–1 defeat of relegation-threatened Luton Town, a 1–0 win over Everton at Goodison Park, and finally a 2–1 home win over Queens Park Rangers. By the end of the spell, Southampton had climbed from 22nd to 17th in the table, with eight points between them and the first relegation place. The penultimate six games included three wins and three losses, which was followed on the final day by another heavy defeat to Arsenal, this time 1–5 at Highbury, matching the season record heaviest defeats from earlier in the campaign – like the 0–4 loss at The Dell in September, this game also included an Ian Wright hat-trick.

Southampton finished the season 16th in the table with 14 wins, ten draws and 18 defeats. Having only scored 39 goals in the 42-game campaign, this marked the first season since 1924–25 that the club had scored less than one goal per game on average; it was also the first time in the club's history that a league season had ended with both a goal-per-game average under 1.0 and a negative goal difference.

=== List of match results ===
17 August 1991 1	Southampton	2–3	Tottenham Hotspur	Southampton
	Shearer 2'; Hall 74'		Lineker 40'; Durie 70'	Stadium: The Dell; Attendance: 18,581

20 August 1991 2	Notts County	1–0	Southampton	Nottingham
	Yates 39'			Stadium: Meadow Lane

24 August 1991 3	Sheffield United	0–2	Southampton	Sheffield
			Shearer 45'; Le Tissier 78'	Stadium: Bramall Lane; Attendance: 18,029

28 August 1991 4	Southampton	0–4	Leeds United	Southampton
			Speed 22', 89'; Strachan 56' (pen.), 70' (pen.)	Stadium: The Dell; Attendance: 15,862

31 August 1991 5	Southampton	1–1	Aston Villa	Southampton
	Shearer 33'		Richardson 2'	Stadium: The Dell; Attendance: 16,161

4 September 1991 6	Luton Town	2–1	Southampton	Luton
	Gray 32'; Harvey 40'		Le Tissier 30' (pen.)	Stadium: Kenilworth Road; Attendance: 8,055

7 September 1991 7	Queens Park Rangers	2–2	Southampton	London
	Barker 68'; Thompson 84'		Shearer 1'; Dowie 81'	Stadium: Loftus Road; Attendance: 9,237

14 September 1991 8	Southampton	0–1	Manchester United	Southampton
			Hughes 48'	Stadium: The Dell; Attendance: 19,264

18 September 1991 9	Southampton	1–0	Wimbledon	Southampton
	Cockerill 40'			Stadium: The Dell; Attendance: 11,280

21 September 1991 10	Sheffield Wednesday	2–0	Southampton	Sheffield
	Harkes 3'; Worthington 65'			Stadium: Hillsborough Stadium; Attendance: 27,291

28 September 1991 11	Southampton	0–4	Arsenal	Southampton
			Rocastle 38'; Wright 40', 46', 74'	Stadium: The Dell; Attendance: 18,050

5 October 1991 12	Oldham Athletic	1–1	Southampton	Manchester
	Henry 66'		Shearer 28'	Stadium: Boundary Park; Attendance: 13,133

19 October 1991 13	Southampton	0–0	Norwich City	Southampton
				Stadium: The Dell; Attendance: 12,516

26 October 1991 14	Nottingham Forest	1–3	Southampton	Nottingham
	Black 84'		Le Tissier 31', 71' (pen.); Shearer 72'	Stadium: City Ground; Attendance: 20,026

2 November 1991 15	Southampton	0–3	Manchester City	Southampton
			Quinn 12'; Sheron 47'; Gittens 59' (o.g.)	Stadium: The Dell; Attendance: 13,933

16 November 1991 16	Crystal Palace	1–0	Southampton	London
	Thomas 67'			Stadium: Selhurst Park; Attendance: 15,861

23 November 1991 17	Southampton	1–0	Chelsea	Southampton
	Shearer 42'			Stadium: The Dell; Attendance: 14,933

30 November 1991 18	Coventry City	2–0	Southampton	Coventry
	Gallacher 23'; Pearce 71'			Stadium: Highfield Road; Attendance: 8,585

7 December 1991 19	Southampton	1–1	Liverpool	Southampton
	Shearer 55'		Redknapp 75'	Stadium: The Dell; Attendance: 10,053

20 December 1991 20	Southampton	1–1	Notts County	Southampton
	Dowie 32'		Slawson 81'	Stadium: The Dell; Attendance: 11,054

26 December 1991 21	Leeds United	3–3	Southampton	Leeds
	Hodge 27', 29'; Speed 73'		Dowie 50', 90'; Shearer 79'	Stadium: Elland Road; Attendance: 22,805

28 December 1991 22	Aston Villa	2–1	Southampton	Birmingham
	Regis 15'; Yorke 60'		Shearer 73'	Stadium: Villa Park; Attendance: 23,094

1 January 1992 23	Southampton	1–2	Everton	Southampton
	Adams 90'		Ward 4'; Beardsley 69'	Stadium: The Dell; Attendance: 16,546

11 January 1992 24	Southampton	2–4	Sheffield United	Southampton
	Le Tissier 3'; Hall 59'		Ward 13'; Lake 58', 82'; Marwood 68'	Stadium: The Dell; Attendance: 12,502

18 January 1992 25	Tottenham Hotspur	1–2	Southampton	London
	Mabbutt 81'		Adams 24'; Dowie 80'	Stadium: White Hart Lane; Attendance: 23,191

1 February 1992 26	Norwich City	2–1	Southampton	Norwich
	Ullathorne 49'; Fleck 74'		Cockerill 71'	Stadium: Carrow Road; Attendance: 10,660

12 February 1992 27	Chelsea	1–1	Southampton	London
	Townsend 74'		Horne 56'	Stadium: Stamford Bridge; Attendance: 7,148

22 February 1992 28	Southampton	0–0	Coventry City	Southampton
				Stadium: The Dell; Attendance: 13,719

29 February 1992 29	Liverpool	0–0	Southampton	Liverpool
				Stadium: Anfield; Attendance: 34,449

3 March 1992 30	Southampton	1–0	West Ham United	Southampton
	Dowie 65'			Stadium: The Dell; Attendance: 14,548

11 March 1992 31	Southampton	1–0	Crystal Palace	Southampton
	Le Tissier 40'			Stadium: The Dell; Attendance: 12,926

15 March 1992 32	Manchester City	0–1	Southampton	Manchester
			Dowie 35'	Stadium: Maine Road; Attendance: 24,265

21 March 1992 33	Southampton	2–1	Luton Town	Southampton
	Shearer 67'; Dowie 80'		Pembridge 45'	Stadium: The Dell; Attendance: 14,192

1 April 1992 34	Everton	0–1	Southampton	Liverpool
			Cockerill 24'	Stadium: Goodison Park; Attendance: 15,201

4 April 1992 35	Southampton	2–1	Queens Park Rangers	Southampton
	Dowie 13'; Shearer 64' (pen.)		Ferdinand 62'	Stadium: The Dell; Attendance: 13,849

8 April 1992 36	Southampton	0–1	Nottingham Forest	Southampton
			Tiler 14'	Stadium: The Dell; Attendance: 14,905

14 April 1992 37	West Ham United	0–1	Southampton	London
			Adams 88'	Stadium: Boleyn Ground; Attendance: 18,298

16 April 1992 38	Manchester United	1–0	Southampton	Manchester
	Kanchelskis 64'			Stadium: Old Trafford; Attendance: 43,972

18 April 1992 39	Southampton	0–1	Sheffield Wednesday	Southampton
			Hirst 69'	Stadium: The Dell; Attendance: 17,715

20 April 1992 40	Wimbledon	0–1	Southampton	London
			Hall 24'	Stadium: Selhurst Park; Attendance: 4,025

25 April 1992 41	Southampton	1–0	Oldham Athletic	Southampton
	Shearer 84'			Stadium: The Dell; Attendance: 15,875

2 May 1992 42	Arsenal	5–1	Southampton	London
	Campbell 66'; Wright 70', 90', 90'; Smith 84'		Cockerill 68'	Stadium: Arsenal Stadium; Attendance: 37,702

=== Final league table ===
Pos	Team	Pld	W	D	L	GF	GA	GD	Pts	Qualification or relegation
14	Chelsea	42	13	14	15	50	60	−10	53	Qualification for the FA Premier League
15	Tottenham Hotspur	42	15	7	20	58	63	−5	52	Qualification for the FA Premier League
16	Southampton	42	14	10	18	39	55	−16	52	Qualification for the FA Premier League
17	Oldham Athletic	42	14	9	19	63	67	−4	51	Qualification for the FA Premier League
18	Norwich City	42	11	12	19	47	63	−16	45	Qualification for the FA Premier League

Source: RSSSF
Rules for classification: 1) Points; 2) Goal difference; 3) Goals scored

=== Results by matchday ===
Round	1	2	3	4	5	6	7	8	9	10	11	12	13	14	15	16	17	18	19	20	21	22	23	24	25	26	27	28	29	30	31	32	33	34	35	36	37	38	39	40	41	42
Ground	H	A	A	H	H	A	A	H	H	A	H	A	H	A	H	A	H	A	H	H	A	A	H	H	A	A	A	H	A	H	H	A	H	A	H	H	A	A	H	A	H	A
Result	L	L	W	L	D	L	D	L	W	L	L	D	D	W	L	L	W	L	D	D	D	L	L	L	W	L	D	D	D	W	W	W	W	W	W	L	W	L	L	W	W	L
Position	14	21	13	19	19	20	19	21	19	19	21	20	20	20	20	20	19	21	20	21	21	22	22	22	21	21	22	22	22	21	19	19	18	19	17	18	17	17	17	17	13	16

Source: 11v11.com
W = Win; D = Draw; L = Loss

== FA Cup ==
Southampton entered the 1991–92 FA Cup in the third round against Queens Park Rangers, a First Division side who were sitting 13th in the league table before the game – nine positions ahead of the Saints. Southampton scored two goals in quick succession in the first half, with Steve Wood heading in a cross from Matt Le Tissier, before Le Tissier scored one himself with a long-range effort just before the break. QPR came close to scoring on numerous occasions in the second half, including a late penalty for a foul by Jason Dodd, but goalkeeper Tim Flowers kept the attacks at bay to keep the 2–0 win safe.

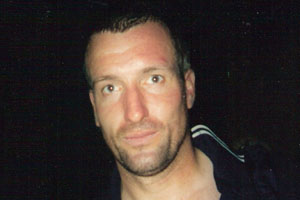
Southampton won their fourth round tie against Manchester United when goalkeeper Tim Flowers saved their fourth penalty in a shootout.

In the fourth round, Southampton hosted Manchester United, who were second in the league and considered "cup favourites" according to club historians. Despite chances for Alan Shearer and Mark Hughes at either end, the game ended in a goalless draw, necessitating a replay at Old Trafford. Stuart Gray put the visiting Saints ahead within ten minutes with his only goal for the club, before Shearer doubled their lead with a header from a Le Tissier free kick; Andrei Kanchelskis pulled one back for the hosts just before the break. After half-time, United increased the pressure on Southampton's goal and finally scored an equaliser in stoppage time at the end of the game, when Brian McClair converted "the flukiest of chances". After a goalless half an hour of extra time, Southampton won the tie through a penalty shootout – Neil Ruddock, Shearer, Barry Horne and Micky Adams all scored for the Saints, while Neil Webb saw his effort go "high and wide" and Ryan Giggs had his penalty saved by Flowers for the win (their first over United in the FA Cup).

Southampton travelled to Manchester again for the fifth round, in which they played Third Division side Bolton Wanderers. The first half saw the Saints go 2–0 up, as centre-back Richard Hall scored two headers in two minutes from successive Le Tissier corners; in the 38th minute, he almost completed a first-half hat-trick with a third goal of the same ilk. The second half saw Southampton continue to dominate, but chances for Le Tissier, Shearer and David Lee were all saved by Bolton goalkeeper David Felgate. In the last 15 minutes of the game, the hosts scored two goals to force a replay, first through Andy Walker and later Scott Green, both as a result of crosses from the wings. The replay at The Dell also ended in a 2–2 draw. In the first 45 minutes, Southampton went 1–0 up through Shearer, before Walker responded 12 minutes before the break. After a relatively quiet second half, Bolton looked set to progress when Julian Darby volleyed past Flowers in the final minute of normal time; from the subsequent kick-off, however, the Saints put pressure on the visitors and eventually equalised through a long-range effort from Horne, which forced extra time. Horne scored again to secure Southampton's passage to the sixth round.

In their first FA Cup sixth round appearance since the 1985–86 season, Southampton faced fellow top-flight strugglers Norwich City. Despite chances for both sides to score during each half, it remained goalless as both teams played defensively to avoid letting in a goal – club historians report that the game was described by commentators as "drab". In a third consecutive replay, Southampton travelled to Carrow Road, where they had lost 1–2 in the league less than two months earlier. However, it was the visitors who opened the scoring just before the half-time break, when Ruddock headed in a corner from Le Tissier. In the second half, however, the Canaries dominated possession and enjoyed numerous chances on goal. A few minutes after the break, Le Tissier was sent off and Rob Newman scored an equaliser a few minutes later. When the game remained 1–1, extra time was played, during which Horne was also dismissed; before the end of extra time, Chris Sutton scored a winner to send Norwich through.

3 January 1992 Round 3	Southampton	2–0	Queens Park Rangers	Southampton
	Wood 26'; Le Tissier 38'			Stadium: The Dell; Attendance: 13,710

26 January 1992 Round 4	Southampton	0–0	Manchester United	Southampton
				Stadium: The Dell; Attendance: 19,506

4 February 1992 Round 4 Replay	Manchester United	2–2 (a.e.t.) (2–4 p)	Southampton	Manchester
	Kanchelskis 42'; McClair 90'		Gray 8'; Shearer 22'	Stadium: Old Trafford; Attendance: 33,414

15 February 1992 Round 5	Bolton Wanderers	2–2	Southampton	Manchester
	Walker 78'; Green 86'		Hall 26', 28'	Stadium: Burnden Park; Attendance: 20,136

25 February 1992 Round 5 Replay	Southampton	3–2 (a.e.t.)	Bolton Wanderers	Southampton
	Shearer 28'; Horne 90'		Walker 33'; Darby 90'	Stadium: The Dell; Attendance: 18,009

7 March 1992 Round 6	Southampton	0–0	Norwich City	Southampton
				Stadium: The Dell; Attendance: 20,088

18 March 1992 Round 6 Replay	Norwich City	2–1 (a.e.t.)	Southampton	Norwich
	Newman 55'; Sutton 116'		Ruddock 45'	Stadium: Carrow Road; Attendance: 21,107

== League Cup ==
Southampton entered the 1991–92 League Cup in the second round against Fourth Division club Scarborough. The visiting Saints won the first leg 3–1 thanks to goals from Alan Shearer (two) and Glenn Cockerill, before a 2–2 draw at The Dell (in which Matt Le Tissier and Cockerill put the hosts 2–0 up within the first three minutes) secured a 5–3 aggregate victory for the top-flight side. The club faced Sheffield Wednesday in the third round, drawing 1–1 at Hillsborough Stadium before beating the newly-promoted First Division side 1–0 in the replay thanks to a Barry Horne header. A replay was also required in the fourth round, after a goalless draw between Southampton and Nottingham Forest; despite hosting the replay, however, the Saints were eliminated by Forest in a 0–1 defeat.

24 September 1991 Round 2 Leg 1	Scarborough	1–3	Southampton	Scarborough
	Mooney 3'		Shearer 17', 27'; Cockerill 77'	Stadium: McCain Stadium; Attendance: 2,303

9 October 1991 Round 2 Leg 2	Southampton	2–2 (5–3 agg.)	Scarborough	Southampton, Hampshire
	Le Tissier 2'; Cockerill 3'		Himsworth 48'; Mocker 74' (pen.)	Stadium: The Dell; Attendance: 4,036

30 October 1991 Round 3	Sheffield Wednesday	1–1	Southampton	Sheffield
	Hirst 38'		Shearer 81'	Stadium: Hillsborough Stadium; Attendance: 17,627

20 November 1991 Round 3 Replay	Southampton	1–0	Sheffield Wednesday	Southampton
	Horne 69'			Stadium: The Dell; Attendance: 10,801

4 December 1991 Round 4	Nottingham Forest	0–0	Southampton	Nottingham
				Stadium: City Ground; Attendance: 17,939

17 December 1991 Round 4 Replay	Southampton	0–1	Nottingham Forest	Southampton
			Gemmill 17'	Stadium: The Dell; Attendance: 10,861

== Full Members' Cup ==
In the final Full Members' Cup before the tournament was discontinued, Southampton entered the second round against Bristol City of the Second Division, winning 2–1 thanks to second-half goals from Alan Shearer and Matt Le Tissier. Another second-flight side, Plymouth Argyle, awaited the Saints in the next round, with a single Le Tissier header securing their passage. In the area semi-finals, Southampton beat fellow First Division relegation risks West Ham United 2–1 at home, with a Shearer header followed in the last five minutes by a winning Le Tissier penalty. In the two-legged area final, Southampton played Chelsea – they won the first leg 2–0 thanks to goals from Shearer and Terry Hurlock, then won the second leg 3–1 thanks to a Le Tissier hat-trick.

In their first cup final since the 1979 League Cup final, the Saints played league rivals Nottingham Forest at Wembley Stadium. The Saints were 0–2 down at half-time, with Forest going ahead through Scot Gemmill and Kingsley Black. Halfway through the second half, Le Tissier pulled one back for his side, heading in a Neil Ruddock cross, before defender Kevin Moore equalised with his own header from a Le Tissier cross six minutes later. The tie was forced to extra time, during which Gemmill scored his second and Forest's third to secure the win.

22 October 1991 Round 2	Bristol City	1–2	Southampton	Bristol
	Taylor 9'		Shearer 69'; Le Tissier 84'	Stadium: Ashton Gate Stadium; Attendance: 5,672

26 November 1991 Round 3	Plymouth Argyle	0–1	Southampton	Plymouth
			Le Tissier 70'	Stadium: Home Park; Attendance: 5,578

7 January 1992 Area Semi-Final	Southampton	2–1	West Ham United	Southampton
	Shearer 67'; Le Tissier 85'		Bishop 34'	Stadium: The Dell; Attendance: 6,861

21 January 1992 Area Final Leg 1	Southampton	2–0	Chelsea	Southampton
	Shearer 15'; Hurlock 79'			Stadium: The Dell; Attendance: 8,726

29 January 1992 Area Final Leg 2	Chelsea	1–3 (1–5 agg.)	Southampton	London
	Wise 37' (pen.)		Le Tissier 6' (pen.), 20', 51'	Stadium: Stamford Bridge; Attendance: 9,781

29 March 1992 Final	Nottingham Forest	3–2 (a.e.t.)	Southampton	London
	Gemmill 15', 112'; Black 45'		Le Tissier 64'; Moore 70'	Stadium: Wembley Stadium; Attendance: 67,688

== Other matches ==
Outside the league and cup competitions, Southampton played two additional matches during 1991–92. The first was a friendly with the Saudi Arabia national team less than a month after the start of the league, which the visiting Saints lost 2–5 with their goals coming from Matt Le Tissier and Neil Maddison. The second extra game came five days after the end of the league campaign in May 1992, as Aldershot hosted Southampton for a testimonial to mark the end of manager Ian McDonald's tenure, as the club was wound up that summer; the First Division side won 2–1, thanks to goals from Glenn Cockerill and Matthew Bound.

11 September 1991 Friendly	Saudi Arabia	5–2	Southampton	Saudi Arabia
			Le Tissier; Maddison

7 May 1992 Ian McDonald Testimonial	Aldershot	1–2	Southampton	Aldershot
			Cockerill; Bound	Stadium: Recreation Ground

== Player details ==
Southampton used 29 players during the 1991–92 season, 12 of whom scored during the campaign. Nine players made their debut appearances for the club, including six of their seven new signings (Iain Dowie, Stuart Gray, Terry Hurlock, David Lee, Paul Moody, and Steve Wood), one loanee (Michael Gilkes) and two players making the step up from youth to the first team (David Hughes and Tommy Widdrington). Eight players made their final appearances for the Saints during the campaign: three left during the season (Alan McLoughlin, Russell Osman, and Paul Rideout), four left before the next season (Jon Gittens, Barry Horne, Neil Ruddock, and Alan Shearer), and one was a short-term loanee (Gilkes). Goalkeeper Tim Flowers and striker Shearer both made the most appearances for Southampton during the season, missing just two matches each and playing in all 59 other games across all competitions. Shearer finished as the season's top goalscorer with 19 goals in all competitions, followed by Matt Le Tissier on 15 goals (Dowie was the club's second-highest scorer in the league, with nine goals to Le Tissier's six). Flowers won the Southampton F.C. Player of the Season award.

=== Squad statistics ===
Name	Pos.	Nat.	League		FA Cup		League Cup		FM Cup		Total	
Name	Pos.	Nat.	Apps.	Goals	Apps.	Goals	Apps.	Goals	Apps.	Goals	Apps.	Goals
Micky Adams	DF	(England)	34	3	4	0	5	0	5	0	48	3
Ian Andrews	GK	(England)	1	0	0	0	0	0	0	0	1	0
Nicky Banger	FW	(England)	0(4)	0	0	0	0(1)	0	1	0	1(5)	0
Francis Benali	DF	(England)	19(3)	0	6	0	0	0	3	0	28(3)	0
Matthew Bound	DF	(England)	0(1)	0	0	0	0	0	0	0	0(1)	0
Oleksiy Cherednyk	DF	(Soviet Union)	0	0	0	0	0	0	0	0	0	0
Glenn Cockerill	MF	(England)	36(1)	4	5(1)	0	5	1	3	0	49(2)	5
Jason Dodd	DF	(England)	26(2)	0	4	0	5	0	3	0	38(2)	0
Iain Dowie	FW	(Northern Ireland)	25(5)	9	4	0	0(3)	0	4	0	33(8)	9
Tim Flowers	GK	(England)	41	0	7	0	5	0	6	0	59	0
Michael Gilkes	MF	(Barbados)	4(2)	0	0	0	0	0	0	0	4(2)	0
Stuart Gray	MF	(England)	10(2)	0	4	1	4	0	1	0	19(2)	1
Richard Hall	DF	(England)	21(5)	3	5	2	3(1)	0	3	0	32(6)	5
Barry Horne	MF	(Wales)	34	1	7	2	4(1)	1	5	0	50(1)	4
David Hughes	MF	(England)	0	0	0	0	0	0	0	0	0	0
Terry Hurlock	MF	(England)	27(2)	0	5	0	4	0	6	1	42(2)	1
Jeff Kenna	DF	(Republic of Ireland)	14	0	3(1)	0	0	0	3	0	20(1)	0
Matt Le Tissier	MF	(England)	31(1)	6	7	1	5	1	6	7	49(1)	15
David Lee	MF	(England)	11(8)	0	0(1)	0	0	0	1(1)	0	12(10)	0
Neil Maddison	MF	(England)	4(2)	0	0(1)	0	0	0	0	0	4(3)	0
Paul Moody	FW	(England)	2(2)	0	0(1)	0	0	0	0	0	2(3)	0
Lee Powell	FW	(Wales)	1(3)	0	0	0	0	0	0	0	1(3)	0
S. Roast	DF	(England)	0	0	0	0	0	0	0	0	0	0
Neil Ruddock	DF	(England)	30	0	6	1	4	0	4	0	44	1
Alan Shearer	FW	(England)	41	13	7	2	5	1	6	3	59	19
Tommy Widdrington	MF	(England)	2(1)	0	0	0	0	0	0	0	2(1)	0
Steve Wood	DF	(England)	15	0	1	1	0	0	4	0	20	1
Squad members who ended the season out on loan
Jon Gittens	DF	(England)	9(2)	0	0	0	4	0	1	0	14(2)	0
Kevin Moore	DF	(England)	15(1)	0	2	0	2	0	1	1	20(1)	1
Paul Tisdale	MF	(England)	0	0	0	0	0	0	0	0	0	0
Players with appearances who left before the end of the season
Alan McLoughlin	MF	(Republic of Ireland)	0(2)	0	0	0	0(1)	0	0	0	0(3)	0
Russell Osman	DF	(England)	5	0	0	0	0	0	0	0	5	0
Paul Rideout	FW	(England)	4	0	0	0	0	0	0	0	4	0

=== Most appearances ===
Rank	Name	Pos.	League		FA Cup		League Cup		FM Cup		Total		
Rank	Name	Pos.	Starts	Subs	Starts	Subs	Starts	Subs	Starts	Subs	Starts	Subs	Total
1	Tim Flowers	GK	41	0	7	0	5	0	6	0	59	0	59
1	Alan Shearer	FW	41	0	7	0	5	0	6	0	59	0	59
3	Barry Horne	MF	34	0	7	0	4	1	5	0	50	1	51
3	Glenn Cockerill	MF	36	1	5	1	5	0	3	0	49	2	51
5	Matt Le Tissier	MF	31	1	7	0	5	0	6	0	49	1	50
6	Micky Adams	DF	34	0	4	0	5	0	5	0	48	0	48
7	Neil Ruddock	DF	30	0	6	0	4	0	4	0	44	0	44
7	Terry Hurlock	MF	27	2	5	0	4	0	6	0	42	2	44
9	Iain Dowie	FW	25	5	4	0	0	3	4	0	33	8	41
10	Jason Dodd	DF	26	2	4	0	5	0	3	0	38	2	40

=== Top goalscorers ===
Rank	Name	Pos.	League		FA Cup		League Cup		FM Cup		Total		
Rank	Name	Pos.	Goals	Apps	Goals	Apps	Goals	Apps	Goals	Apps	Goals	Apps	GPG
1	Alan Shearer	FW	13	41	2	7	1	5	3	6	19	59	0.32
2	Matt Le Tissier	MF	6	32	1	7	1	5	7	6	15	50	0.30
3	Iain Dowie	FW	9	30	0	4	0	3	0	4	9	41	0.22
4	Richard Hall	DF	3	26	2	5	0	4	0	3	5	38	0.13
4	Glenn Cockerill	MF	4	37	0	6	1	5	0	3	5	51	0.10
6	Barry Horne	MF	1	34	2	7	1	5	0	5	4	51	0.08
7	Micky Adams	DF	3	34	0	4	0	5	0	5	3	48	0.06
8	Steve Wood	DF	0	15	1	1	0	0	0	4	1	20	0.05
8	Stuart Gray	MF	0	12	1	4	0	4	0	1	1	21	0.05
8	Kevin Moore	DF	0	16	0	2	0	2	1	1	1	21	0.05
8	Terry Hurlock	MF	0	29	0	5	0	4	1	6	1	44	0.02
8	Neil Ruddock	DF	0	30	1	6	0	4	0	4	1	44	0.02

== Bibliography ==
- Holley, Duncan; Chalk, Gary (2003), Bull, David (ed.), In That Number: A Post-War Chronicle of Southampton FC, Bristol, England: Hagiology Publishing, ISBN 0-9534474-3-X
