= 1990–91 Southampton F.C. season =

Southampton F.C.
1990–91 season
- Chairman: Guy Askham
- Manager: Chris Nicholl
- Stadium: The Dell
- First Division: 14th
- FA Cup: Fifth round
- League Cup: Fifth round
- Full Members' Cup: Third round
- Top goalscorer: League: Matt Le Tissier (19); All: Matt Le Tissier (23)
- Highest home attendance: 21,405 v Tottenham; Hotspur (29 December 1990)
- Lowest home attendance: 5,071 v Queens Park; Rangers (20 November 1990)
- Average home league attendance: 15,413
- Biggest win: 5–0 v Rochdale (25 September 1990)
- Biggest defeat: 0–4 v Arsenal (17 November 1990); 2–6 v Derby County (4 May 1991)
Home colours	Away colours	Third colours

The 1990–91 Southampton F.C. season was the club's 90th season of competitive football and their 21st in the First Division of the Football League. The season was a disappointing one for the Saints, who finished 14th in the league, marking Chris Nicholl's joint worst result as manager. Outside the First Division, the Saints reached the fifth round of both the FA Cup and the League Cup (the same as the season before), and the third round of the Full Members' Cup. 1990–91 was Southampton's final season to feature Nicholl as manager – he was sacked upon the season's end in June 1991.

Like the previous season, Southampton did not make any signings in the transfer window ahead of the 1990–91 campaign, although Graham Baker, Mark Blake and Gerry Forrest all left the club. Partway through the season, however, Nicholl did bolster the squad with the additions of Sergey Gotsmanov, Alan McLoughlin, Richard Hall, and the returning Jon Gittens. Southampton's league form was poor throughout most of the campaign, with the side generally remaining in the mid-table area and rarely threatening the higher positions. Their worst spell came between November and December, when they failed to pick up a win in six games, including suffering five defeats. A few key wins towards season end kept the Saints safe from the risk of relegation.

In the FA Cup, Southampton edged past Second Division side Ipswich Town in the third round and overcame top-flight rivals Coventry City in the fourth round after a replay. They were knocked out in the fifth round by Nottingham Forest, another First Division club, who went on to reach the final of the tournament (before losing in extra time). In the League Cup, they thrashed Rochdale of the Fourth Division in the second round, followed by wins over Ipswich Town and Crystal Palace, but faced elimination in the fifth round at the hands of Manchester United, who – like Forest in the FA Cup – went on to reach the final of the tournament. In their return to the Full Members' Cup, the Saints beat Queens Park Rangers before losing to Norwich City in the third round.

Southampton used 27 players during the 1990–91 season and had 12 different goalscorers. Like the previous season, their top two scorers were Matt Le Tissier and Rod Wallace, who scored 23 and 19 goals, respectively, in all competitions. Midfielder Barry Horne was the only Saints player to feature in all 51 games across the four competitions. Striker Alan Shearer, who finished third in the goal rankings with 14, won the 1990–91 Southampton F.C. Player of the Season award. The average league attendance at The Dell during 1990–91 was 15,413. The highest attendance was 21,405 against Tottenham Hotspur on 29 December 1990 and the lowest was 5,071 against Queens Park Rangers in the Full Members' Cup on 20 November 1990.

== Background and transfers ==
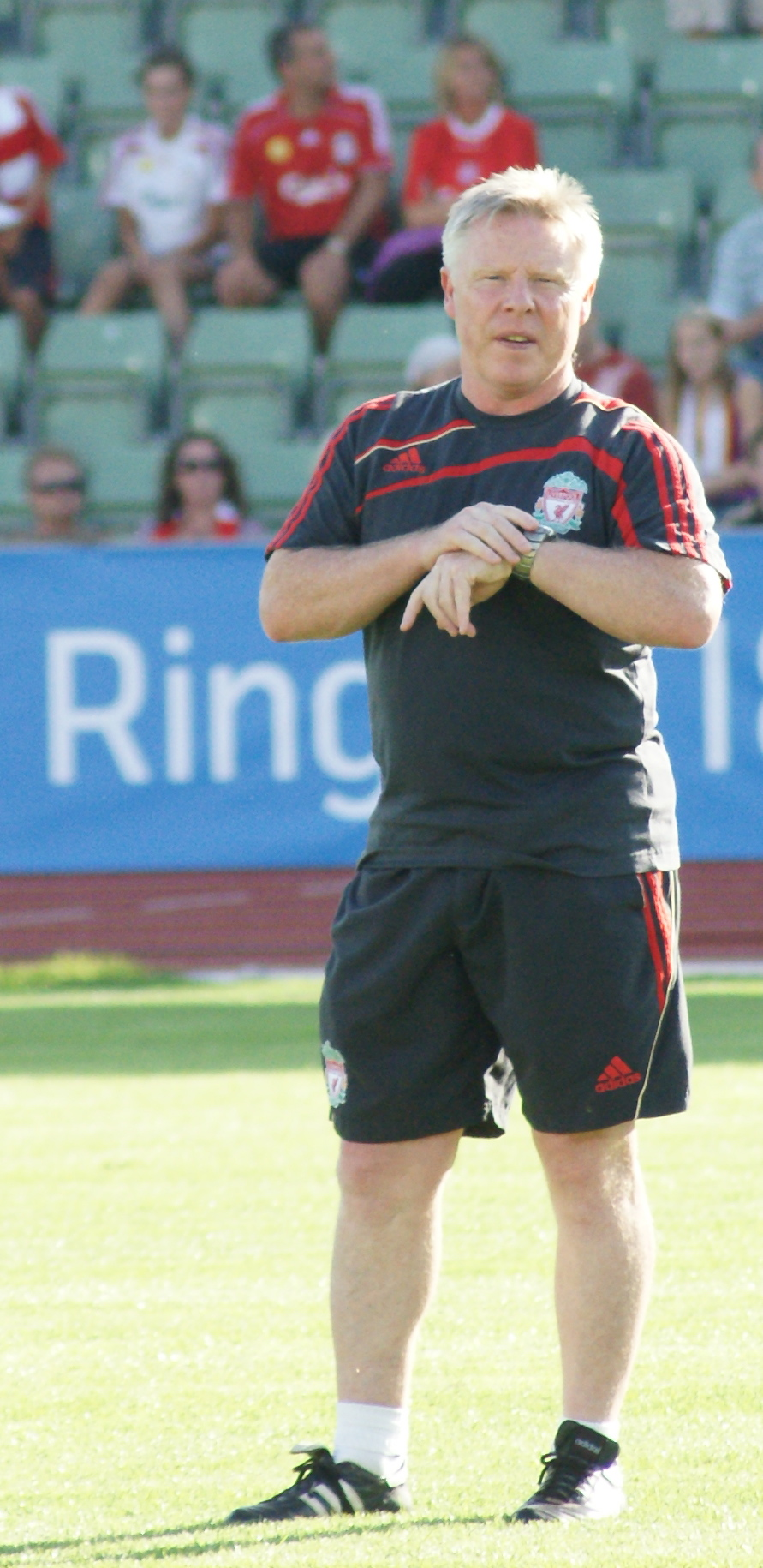
Having made just three substitute appearances since his arrival in January, Sammy Lee left on a free transfer to Bolton Wanderers at the beginning of the 1990–91 season.

Having led Southampton to their highest league finish since his arrival as manager, Chris Nicholl opted not to make any new signings during the summer 1990 transfer window. However, there were several players who left the club ahead of the 1990–91 campaign, all moving to Third Division sides in August 1990: centre-back Mark Blake, who had been with the club since 1984 but struggled to establish his place in the first team, was sold to Shrewsbury Town for a fee of £100,000; midfielder Graham Baker, who had made just shy of 200 appearances for the Saints over two tenures totalling nine years, left on a free transfer for Fulham; and right-back Gerry Forrest, who had lost his place in the team following a serious injury in 1989, moved back to his former club Rotherham United on a free transfer. Sammy Lee was released to Bolton Wanderers in October.

Shortly after the start of the season, Nicholl made his first signing of the season, bringing in Soviet attacking midfielder Sergey Gotsmanov from Brighton & Hove Albion for £150,000. He was followed in December by another attacking midfielder, Republic of Ireland international Alan McLoughlin, who joined from Swindon Town in the Second Division for a Saints record fee of £1 million. The additions continued into the second half of the season – in February, promising young centre-back Richard Hall was signed from Fourth Division side Scunthorpe United for £200,000; in March, Jon Gittens returned from Swindon Town – to whom the Saints had sold the defender just under four years earlier – for a fee of £400,000; and the same month, Welsh midfielder David Hughes arrived from non-league side Weymouth as a trainee (he would turn professional at the beginning of the next season). Steve Davis and Paul Rideout spent the final few months of the season out on loan, at Notts County and Swindon Town, respectively (both would leave in the summer).

Players transferred in

Name	Nationality	Pos.	Club	Date	Fee	Ref.
Neal Bartlett	England	MF	none (free agent)	June 1990	Free (Note: Neal Bartlett initially signed as an associate schoolboy in June 1990, before becoming a trainee in June 1991 and turning professional in July 1993.)	
Sergey Gotsmanov	Soviet Union	MF	(England) Brighton & Hove Albion	September 1990	£150,000	
Alan McLoughlin	Republic of Ireland	MF	(England) Swindon Town	December 1990	£1,000,000	
Richard Hall	England	DF	(England) Scunthorpe United	February 1991	£200,000	
Jon Gittens	England	DF	(England) Swindon Town	March 1991	£400,000	
David Hughes	Wales	MF	(England) Weymouth	March 1991	Free (Note: David Hughes initially signed as a trainee in March 1991, before turning professional that August.)	

Players transferred out

Name	Nationality	Pos.	Club	Date	Fee	Ref.
Graham Baker	England	MF	(England) Fulham	August 1990	Free	
Mark Blake	England	DF	(England) Shrewsbury Town	August 1990	£100,000	
Gerry Forrest	England	DF	(England) Rotherham United	August 1990	Free	
Sammy Lee	England	MF	(England) Bolton Wanderers	October 1990	Free	

Players loaned in

Name	Nationality	Pos.	Club	Date from	Date to	Ref.
Keith Granger	England	GK	(England) Basingstoke Town	November 1990	December 1990	

Players loaned out

Name	Nationality	Pos.	Club	Date from	Date to	Ref.
Steve Davis	England	DF	(England) Notts County	March 1991	End of season	
Paul Rideout	England	FW	(England) Swindon Town	March 1991	End of season	

== Pre-season friendlies ==
Ahead of the 1990–91 league campaign, Southampton played seven pre-season friendlies. The first of these was a 6–0 win over Weymouth of the Southern League in which Alan Shearer scored a hat-trick, which was played on the same day as an alternate squad won 8–1 over Slough Town of the Conference (Paul Rideout scored five times in this game). A few days later, the club completed a short tour of Norway which included a goalless draw against Tromsø and a 2–3 defeat at Rosenborg (who went on to win the Eliteserien that year). Back in England, Southampton's final three pre-season friendlies saw them beat Conference side Wycombe Wanderers 1–0, draw 0–0 with Southern League side Bashley, and lose 0–2 to Second Division side Wolverhampton Wanderers.

4 August 1990 Friendly	Weymouth	0–6	Southampton	Weymouth
			Shearer; Maddison; Ray Wallace	Stadium: Wessex Stadium

4 August 1990 Friendly	Slough Town	1–8	Southampton	Slough
			Rideout; Le Tissier; Moore; Rowland	Stadium: Wexham Park Stadium

7 August 1990 Friendly	Tromsø	0–0	Southampton	Tromsø, Norway
				Stadium: Alfheim Stadion

9 August 1990 Friendly	Rosenborg	3–2	Southampton	Trondheim, Norway
			Case; Le Tissier	Stadium: Lerkendal Stadion

11 August 1990 Friendly	Wycombe Wanderers	0–1	Southampton	High Wycombe
			Rod Wallace	Stadium: Adams Park

11 August 1990 Friendly	Bashley	0–0	Southampton	Bashley
				Stadium: Bashley Road

17 August 1990 Friendly	Wolverhampton Wanderers	2–0	Southampton	Wolverhampton
				Stadium: Molineux Stadium

== First Division ==
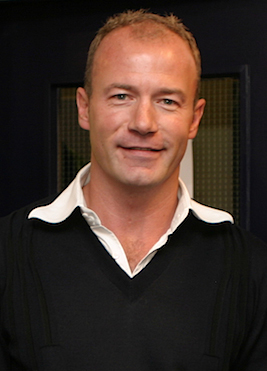
Alan Shearer played 36 of Southampton's 38 league games in 1990–91, picking up the Player of the Season award at the end of the year.

Southampton started the 1990–91 league campaign slowly, picking up one draw (at last season's runners-up Aston Villa), one win (a narrow 1–0 victory over Norwich City) and two losses (against Luton Town and Nottingham Forest) in their first four fixtures. A 2–0 win over recently promoted Sheffield United was followed by two more losses on the road – at Manchester United and Everton – after which the Saints sat 15th in the First Division table. October brought similarly mixed fortunes – the month began with a "hectic, full-blooded" match at home to Chelsea, which ended in a 3–3 draw. This was followed by a 2–1 win over Coventry City and a 0–1 defeat at home to Derby County, who had only avoided relegation the season before by three points, after which Nicholl claimed that no one besides goalkeeper Tim Flowers "justified their place [in the team] or their wage packet".

After a 1–1 draw at Wimbledon and a "comfortable" 3–1 win over Queens Park Rangers, the Saints lost four games in a row and dropped as low as 17th in the league table. The first game in the spell saw the club suffer its heaviest defeat of the season, losing 0–4 to eventual title winners Arsenal. This was followed by a 2–3 home defeat to in-form Crystal Palace, a 1–2 loss at Leeds United in which the hosts scored two in first ten minutes of the game, and finally a 1–3 loss away to Norwich City. A home draw with Aston Villa in which record signing Alan McLoughlin debuted was followed by another away defeat, this time a 2–3 loss at defending champions Liverpool. 1990 ended with Southampton's first two wins in a row of the season, as they beat Manchester City 2–1 at home thanks to a late winner from Matt Le Tissier, and a few days later beat top-three side Tottenham Hotspur at The Dell in which Le Tissier scored a brace. Having picked up key points following their spell of four consecutive losses, the Saints ended the year 13th in the table.

1991 started with a defeat at Sunderland, which was followed by a hard-fought 4–3 win away at Luton Town, in which top scorers Le Tissier and Rod Wallace shared the goals equally. More poor form followed, as the team won just one of their next seven games (at home to Leeds United), and as a result dropped into the relegation zone for the first time. The Saints fought back in late March, picking up a 2–0 away win at Chelsea and responding three times to pick up a point at Manchester City. On 1 April, they unexpectedly beat back-to-back title hopefuls Liverpool 1–0 at home, with Le Tissier scoring the only goal of the game in just the fourth minute, which club historians report "knocked a massive dent in Liverpool's championship hopes". After a 0–2 loss at Tottenham Hotspur, the Saints held champions-elect Arsenal to a 1–1 draw at The Dell.

The last four First Division fixtures for Southampton included two home wins, over strugglers Sunderland and Coventry City, as the club pulled themselves free from any risk of relegation. In the penultimate game of the season, however, the Saints suffered a humiliating 2–6 defeat at Derby County, who had not won a game in over five months and sat bottom of the First Division table. The visitors were 0–2 down within 18 minutes and trailed 1–5 with just five minutes left to play, with Paul Williams having scored a first-half hat-trick; this marked the joint heaviest defeat of Southampton's season. The final game of the campaign saw the Hampshire side draw 1–1 with Wimbledon, with Jimmy Case scoring the only goal – his only league goal of the season.

Shortly after the season ended, manager Chris Nicholl was sacked by Southampton's board after six seasons, with first-team coach Dennis Rofe leaving with him.

=== List of match results ===
25 August 1990 1	Aston Villa	1–1	Southampton	Birmingham
	Cascarino 11'		Le Tissier 7'	Stadium: Villa Park; Attendance: 29,542

28 August 1990 2	Southampton	1–0	Norwich City	Southampton
	Polston 63' (o.g.)			Stadium: The Dell; Attendance: 17,206

1 September 1990 3	Southampton	1–2	Luton Town	Southampton
	Rideout 32'		Elstrup 18', 27'	Stadium: The Dell; Attendance: 13,538

8 September 1990 4	Nottingham Forest	3–1	Southampton	Nottingham
	Wilson 38'; Jemson 52', 54'		Rod Wallace 24'	Stadium: City Ground; Attendance: 18,559

15 September 1990 5	Southampton	2–0	Sheffield United	Southampton
	Le Tissier 5'; Rod Wallace 28'			Stadium: The Dell; Attendance: 14,340

22 September 1990 6	Manchester United	3–2	Southampton	Manchester
	McClair 20'; Blackmore 61'; Hughes 63'		Rideout 31'; Rod Wallace 66'	Stadium: Old Trafford; Attendance: 41,228

29 September 1990 7	Everton	3–0	Southampton	Liverpool
	Cottee 24', 71'; Ebbrell 31'			Stadium: Goodison Park; Attendance: 23,093

6 October 1990 8	Southampton	3–3	Chelsea	Southampton
	Shearer 13'; Ruddock 51'; Rod Wallace 62'		Clarke 23'; Wilson 44'; Wise 73' (pen.)	Stadium: The Dell; Attendance: 16,911

20 October 1990 9	Coventry City	1–2	Southampton	Coventry
	Borrows 40' (pen.)		Billing 5' (o.g.); Le Tissier 49'	Stadium: Highfield Road; Attendance: 10,040

27 October 1990 10	Southampton	0–1	Derby County	Southampton
			Harford 7'	Stadium: The Dell; Attendance: 16,328

3 November 1990 11	Wimbledon	1–1	Southampton	London
	Flowers 61'		Le Tissier 80' (pen.)	Stadium: Plough Lane; Attendance: 5,485

10 November 1990 12	Southampton	3–1	Queens Park Rangers	Southampton
	Rideout 8'; Le Tissier 74'; Rod Wallace 88'		Falco 41'	Stadium: The Dell; Attendance: 14,970

17 November 1990 13	Arsenal	4–0	Southampton	London
	Merson 20'; Limpar 32'; Smith 37', 59'			Stadium: Arsenal Stadium; Attendance: 36,229

24 November 1990 14	Southampton	2–3	Crystal Palace	Southampton
	Shaw 1' (o.g.); Rideout 36'		Wright 30', 33'; Bright 53'	Stadium: The Dell; Attendance: 15,851

1 December 1990 15	Leeds United	2–1	Southampton	Leeds
	Fairclough 5'; Shutt 10'		Rideout 49'	Stadium: Elland Road; Attendance: 29,341

8 December 1990 16	Norwich City	3–1	Southampton	Norwich
	Phillips 36'; Ruddock 53' (o.g.); Bowen 55'		Le Tissier 5'	Stadium: Carrow Road; Attendance: 11,705

15 December 1990 17	Southampton	1–1	Aston Villa	Southampton
	Le Tissier 42'		Platt 78' (pen.)	Stadium: The Dell; Attendance: 16,604

22 December 1990 18	Liverpool	3–2	Southampton	Liverpool
	Rosenthal 33', 43'; Houghton 83'		Rod Wallace 18', 49'	Stadium: Anfield; Attendance: 31,894

26 December 1990 19	Southampton	2–1	Manchester City	Southampton
	Horne 39'; Le Tissier 81'		Quinn 35'	Stadium: The Dell; Attendance: 16,029

29 December 1990 20	Southampton	3–0	Tottenham Hotspur	Southampton
	Le Tissier 17', 73'; Rod Wallace 67'			Stadium: The Dell; Attendance: 21,405

1 January 1991 21	Sunderland	1–0	Southampton	Sunderland
	Ball 47' (pen.)			Stadium: Roker Park; Attendance: 19,757

12 January 1991 22	Luton Town	3–4	Southampton	Luton
	Elstrup 24'; James 26'; Dreyer 78' (pen.)		Rod Wallace 10', 63'; Le Tissier 28', 46'	Stadium: Kenilworth Road; Attendance: 9,021

19 January 1991 23	Southampton	1–1	Nottingham Forest	Southampton
	Crossley 31' (o.g.)		Clough 41'	Stadium: The Dell; Attendance: 16,044

2 February 1991 24	Sheffield United	4–1	Southampton	Sheffield
	Booker 19', 20'; Hodges 29'; Deane 30'		Moore 54'	Stadium: Bramall Lane; Attendance: 16,887

23 February 1991 25	Queens Park Rangers	2–1	Southampton	London
	Ferdinand 7', 26'		Le Tissier 65' (pen.)	Stadium: Loftus Road; Attendance: 11,009

2 March 1991 26	Southampton	2–0	Leeds United	Southampton
	Rideout 10'; Cockerill 85'			Stadium: The Dell; Attendance: 16,585

9 March 1991 27	Crystal Palace	2–1	Southampton	London
	Thomas 66', 68'		Cockerill 84'	Stadium: Selhurst Park; Attendance: 14,529

13 March 1991 28	Southampton	1–1	Manchester United	Southampton
	Ruddock 13'		Ince 57'	Stadium: The Dell; Attendance: 15,701

16 March 1991 29	Southampton	3–4	Everton	Southampton
	Ruddock 37'; Newell 65' (o.g.); Shearer 82'		Watson 31'; Milligan 38'; Newell 74'; Cottee 78'	Stadium: The Dell; Attendance: 15,410

23 March 1991 30	Chelsea	0–2	Southampton	London
			Shearer 24'; Le Tissier 57' (pen.)	Stadium: Stamford Bridge; Attendance: 13,391

30 March 1991 31	Manchester City	3–3	Southampton	Manchester
	Allen 65'; Brennan 73'; White 85'		Le Tissier 47'; Osman 81'; McLoughlin 90'	Stadium: Maine Road; Attendance: 23,163

1 April 1991 32	Southampton	1–0	Liverpool	Southampton
	Le Tissier 4'			Stadium: The Dell; Attendance: 20,255

6 April 1991 33	Tottenham Hotspur	2–0	Southampton	London
	Lineker 37', 40'			Stadium: White Hart Lane; Attendance: 24,291

9 April 1991 34	Southampton	1–1	Arsenal	Southampton
	Le Tissier 79'		Adams 74' (o.g.)	Stadium: The Dell; Attendance: 21,200

13 April 1991 35	Southampton	3–1	Sunderland	Southampton
	Rod Wallace 44'; Le Tissier 81' (pen.); Shearer 83'		Hauser 24'	Stadium: The Dell; Attendance: 16,812

20 April 1991 36	Southampton	2–1	Coventry City	Southampton
	Rod Wallace 27', 31'		Gynn 73'	Stadium: The Dell; Attendance: 15,461

4 May 1991 37	Derby County	6–2	Southampton	Derby
	P. Williams 5', 18', 42' (pen.); Saunders 60', 88'; Phillips 85'		Rod Wallace 33'; Le Tissier 87' (pen.)	Stadium: Baseball Ground; Attendance: 11,680

11 May 1991 38	Southampton	1–1	Wimbledon	Southampton
	Case 43'		Fashanu 48'	Stadium: The Dell; Attendance: 17,052

=== Final league table ===
Pos	Team	Pld	W	D	L	GF	GA	GD	Pts
12	Queens Park Rangers	38	12	10	16	44	53	−9	46
13	Sheffield United	38	13	7	18	36	55	−19	46
14	Southampton	38	12	9	17	58	69	−11	45
15	Norwich City	38	13	6	19	41	64	−23	45
16	Coventry City	38	11	11	16	42	49	−7	44

Source: RSSSF
Rules for classification: 1) Points; 2) Goal difference; 3) Goals scored

=== Results by matchday ===
Round	1	2	3	4	5	6	7	8	9	10	11	12	13	14	15	16	17	18	19	20	21	22	23	24	25	26	27	28	29	30	31	32	33	34	35	36	37	38
Ground	A	H	H	A	H	A	A	H	A	H	A	H	A	H	A	A	H	A	H	H	A	A	H	A	A	H	A	H	H	A	A	H	A	H	H	H	A	H
Result	D	W	L	L	W	L	L	D	W	L	D	W	L	L	L	L	D	L	W	W	L	W	D	L	L	W	L	D	L	W	D	W	L	D	W	W	L	D
Position	7	6	10	14	10	11	15	15	13	14	15	8	11	12	15	17	14	14	14	13	15	12	13	14	14	13	15	16	18	16	17	15	16	15	15	12	15	14

Source: 11v11.com
A = Away; H = Home; W = Win; D = Draw; L = Loss

== FA Cup ==
Southampton entered the 1990–91 FA Cup in the third round against Second Division side Ipswich Town, with the game drawn at The Dell. The second-flight visitors opened the scoring early on through Jason Dozzell, before Alan Shearer headed in a corner from Matt Le Tissier to equalise. Just before half time, the roles were reversed as Shearer turned provider for Le Tissier, with the Saints going ahead on the stroke of the break. Within 15 minutes of the restart, the hosts were 3–1 up as Le Tissier scored his second of the game, converting a cross from Micky Adams. Shearer almost followed in doubling his personal tally, but it was Ipswich's Dozzell who struck again ten minutes from full-time, although Southampton held on for the win. In the fourth round, the Saints faced First Division opponents Coventry City. After a 1–1 draw at Highfield Road, the Saints progressed with a 2–0 replay win at home, with goals from Jimmy Case and Rod Wallace either side of half time giving them the victory.

The fifth round saw Southampton host Nottingham Forest, who they had failed to beat in the league in both fixtures of the campaign. The Saints went one up after just two minutes, when Neil Ruddock headed in a corner from Le Tissier, and continued to dominate the half when Glenn Cockerill came close twice and a Paul Rideout goal was disallowed due to offside. The home side continued to enjoy chances in the second half, with Cockerill coming close again, before Forest equalised in the 80th minute through Steve Hodge, forcing a replay. In the rematch at City Ground, Southampton came close to opening the scoring in the first few minutes, as Wallace hit the post and Ruddock saw his header cleared off the line by the Forest defence. Wallace did open the scoring in the 14th minute, but at half-time the teams were level after Nigel Jemson converted a penalty awarded for a "dubious" handball decision against Francis Benali. Jemson scored twice more after the break to complete his hat-trick and Southampton's elimination from the cup.

5 January 1991 Round 3	Southampton	3–2	Ipswich Town	Southampton
	Shearer; Le Tissier 43', 59'		Dozzell 12', 80'	Stadium: The Dell; Attendance: 15,101

26 January 1991 Round 4	Coventry City	1–1	Southampton	Coventry
	Kilcline		Shearer (pen.)	Stadium: Highfield Road; Attendance: 14,013

29 January 1991 Round 4 Replay	Southampton	2–0	Coventry City	Southampton
	Case 37'; Rod Wallace 78'			Stadium: The Dell; Attendance: 17,001

25 February 1991 Round 5	Southampton	1–1	Nottingham Forest	Southampton
	Ruddock 2'		Hodge 80'	Stadium: The Dell; Attendance: 18,512

4 March 1991 Round 5 Replay	Nottingham Forest	3–1	Southampton	Nottingham
	Jemson (pen.)		Rod Wallace 14'	Stadium: City Ground; Attendance: 26,633

== League Cup ==
Southampton entered the 1990–91 League Cup in the second round against Fourth Division side Rochdale. The visiting Saints thrashed the hosts 5–0 in the first leg, with Alan Shearer scoring twice before Barry Horne, Rod Wallace and Neil Ruddock all added to the tally in the last ten minutes of the match. In the second leg at The Dell, the hosts added three more to their winning aggregate score, with Nicky Banger scoring a hat-trick on his debut for the club. Southampton beat Ipswich Town and Crystal Palace 2–0 in the third and fourth rounds, respectively, with leading scorers Matt Le Tissier, Rod Wallace and Shearer sharing the goals. In the fifth round, the Saints were held to a 1–1 draw at home by Manchester United, who then won the replay at Old Trafford 3–2 thanks to a second-half Mark Hughes hat-trick.

25 September 1990 Round 2 Leg 1	Rochdale	0–5	Southampton	Manchester
			Shearer 46', 75'; Horne 82'; Rod Wallace 83'; Ruddock 87'	Stadium: Spotland Stadium; Attendance: 3,855

9 October 1990 Round 2 Leg 2	Southampton	3–0 (8–0 agg.)	Rochdale	Southampton
	Banger 30', 32', 55'			Stadium: The Dell; Attendance: 6,754

30 October 1990 Round 3	Ipswich Town	0–2	Southampton	Ipswich
			Le Tissier 20'; Rod Wallace 77'	Stadium: Portman Road; Attendance: 15,573

27 November 1990 Round 4	Southampton	2–0	Crystal Palace	Southampton
	Le Tissier 42'; Shearer 59'			Stadium: The Dell; Attendance: 13,765

16 January 1991 Round 5	Southampton	1–1	Manchester United	Southampton
	Shearer 71'		Hughes 77'	Stadium: The Dell; Attendance: 21,011

23 January 1991 Round 5 Replay	Manchester United	3–2	Southampton	Manchester
	Hughes 51', 61', 77'		Shearer 52', 87' (pen.)	Stadium: Old Trafford; Attendance: 41,903

== Full Members' Cup ==
Southampton entered the 1990–91 Full Members' Cup in the second round, where they thrashed Queens Park Rangers 4–0 at home, with goals coming from Alan Shearer (two), Barry Horne and a Brian Law own goal. The Saints lost 1–2 at Norwich City in the third round, with a second-minute Rod Wallace goal cancelled out by two goals in quick succession just before half time.

20 November 1990 Round 2	Southampton	4–0	Queens Park Rangers	Southampton
	Shearer 14', 44'; Horne 17'; Law 80' (o.g.)			Stadium: The Dell; Attendance: 5,071

20 February 1991 Round 3	Norwich City	2–1	Southampton	Norwich
	Fleck 28'; Goss 40'		Rod Wallace 2'	Stadium: Carrow Road; Attendance: 5,920

== Other matches ==
Southampton played three additional matches during the final weeks of the 1990–91 season. In April, they beat Wessex League side Christchurch 5–0, with a hat-trick for Alan Shearer alongside goals for Matt Le Tissier and Rod Wallace. Two days after the end of the league, the Saints were hosted by Southern League club Poole Town for the testimonial of Tony Funnell, which the visitors won 5–3 thanks to goals from Shearer (two), Jimmy Case, Glenn Cockerill and Ray Wallace. Finally, three days later, they also beat Ryde Sports of the Wessex League 8–1, with goals including a Le Tissier hat-trick.

24 April 1991 Friendly	Christchurch	0–5	Southampton	Christchurch
			Shearer; Le Tissier; Rod Wallace	Stadium: Hurn Bridge Ground

13 May 1991 Tony Funnell Testimonial	Poole Town	3–5	Southampton	Poole
			Shearer; Case; Cockerill; Ray Wallace	Stadium: Poole Stadium

16 May 1991 Friendly	Ryde Sports	1–8	Southampton	Ryde
			Le Tissier; Cockerill; Maddison; Shearer; Rod Wallace; Ray Wallace	Stadium: Smallbrook Stadium

== Player details ==
Southampton used 27 players during the 1990–91 season, 12 of whom scored during the campaign. Five players made their debut appearances for the club, including three of their six new signings (Sergey Gotsmanov, Richard Hall, and Alan McLoughlin) and one player making the step up from youth to the first team (Lee Powell). Six players made their final appearances for the Saints during the campaign: Gotsmanov, Jimmy Case, Andy Cook, Steve Davis, Ray Wallace, and Rod Wallace. Midfielder Barry Horne made the most appearances for Southampton during 1990–91, playing in all 51 games across all four competitions; he was followed by goalkeeper Tim Flowers, who missed just one game each in the league and the Full Members' Cup. Matt Le Tissier finished as the season's top goalscorer for the second consecutive season with 23 goals in all competitions, followed by Rod Wallace on 19 goals. Alan Shearer won the Southampton F.C. Player of the Season award for the 1990–91 season.

=== Squad statistics ===
Name	Pos.	Nat.	League		FA Cup		League Cup		FM Cup		Total	
Name	Pos.	Nat.	Apps.	Goals	Apps.	Goals	Apps.	Goals	Apps.	Goals	Apps.	Goals
Micky Adams	DF	(England)	29(1)	0	2	0	5	0	1	0	37(1)	0
Ian Andrews	GK	(England)	1	0	0	0	0	0	1	0	2	0
Nicky Banger	FW	(England)	0(6)	0	0	0	1	3	0	0	1(6)	3
Francis Benali	DF	(England)	9(3)	0	2	0	1(2)	0	0(1)	0	12(6)	0
Jimmy Case	MF	(England)	24(1)	1	3	1	4	0	0	0	31(1)	2
Oleksiy Cherednyk	DF	(Soviet Union)	12(3)	0	1	0	3	0	0	0	16(3)	0
Glenn Cockerill	MF	(England)	28(4)	2	3	0	4(1)	0	2	0	37(5)	2
Andy Cook	DF	(England)	5(2)	0	1	0	2	0	1	0	9(2)	0
Jason Dodd	DF	(England)	16(3)	0	4	0	3	0	2	0	25(3)	0
Tim Flowers	GK	(England)	37	0	5	0	6	0	1	0	49	0
Jon Gittens	DF	(England)	7(1)	0	0	0	0	0	0	0	7(1)	0
Sergey Gotsmanov	MF	(Soviet Union)	2(6)	0	2	0	2	0	2	0	8(6)	0
Richard Hall	DF	(England)	0(1)	0	0	0	0	0	0	0	0(1)	0
Barry Horne	MF	(Wales)	38	1	5	0	6	1	2	1	51	3
Jeff Kenna	DF	(Republic of Ireland)	1(1)	0	0	0	0	0	0	0	1(1)	0
Matt Le Tissier	MF	(England)	34(1)	19	3	2	4	2	1	0	42(1)	23
Neil Maddison	MF	(England)	1(3)	0	0(1)	0	0	0	0	0	1(4)	0
Alan McLoughlin	MF	(Republic of Ireland)	22	1	4	0	0	0	1	0	27	1
Kevin Moore	DF	(England)	19	1	4	0	3	0	1	0	27	1
Russell Osman	DF	(England)	17(3)	1	3	0	5	0	1	0	26(3)	1
Lee Powell	FW	(Wales)	0	0	0	0	0(1)	0	0(1)	0	0(2)	0
Andy Rowland	FW	(England)	0	0	0	0	0	0	0	0	0	0
Neil Ruddock	DF	(England)	32(3)	3	3	1	4	1	2	0	41(3)	5
Alan Shearer	FW	(England)	34(2)	4	3(1)	2	6	6	2	2	45(3)	14
Ray Wallace	DF	(England)	0	0	0	0	1	0	0	0	1	0
Rod Wallace	FW	(England)	35(2)	14	5	2	4(1)	2	1	1	45(3)	19
Tommy Widdrington	MF	(England)	0	0	0	0	0	0	0	0	0	0
Players with appearances who ended the season out on loan
Steve Davis	DF	(England)	1(1)	0	0	0	0	0	0	0	1(1)	0
Paul Rideout	FW	(England)	14(2)	6	2	0	2	0	1	0	19(2)	6

=== Most appearances ===
Rank	Name	Pos.	League		FA Cup		League Cup		FM Cup		Total		
Rank	Name	Pos.	Starts	Subs	Starts	Subs	Starts	Subs	Starts	Subs	Starts	Subs	Total
1	Barry Horne	MF	38	0	5	0	6	0	2	0	51	0	51
2	Tim Flowers	GK	37	0	5	0	6	0	1	0	49	0	49
3	Alan Shearer	FW	34	2	3	1	6	0	2	0	45	3	48
3	Rod Wallace	FW	35	2	5	0	4	1	1	0	45	3	48
5	Neil Ruddock	DF	32	3	3	0	4	0	2	0	41	3	44
6	Matt Le Tissier	MF	34	1	3	0	4	0	1	0	42	1	43
7	Glenn Cockerill	MF	28	4	3	0	4	1	2	0	37	5	42
8	Micky Adams	DF	29	1	2	0	5	0	1	0	37	1	38
9	Jimmy Case	MF	24	1	3	0	4	0	0	0	31	1	32
10	Russell Osman	DF	17	3	3	0	5	0	1	0	26	3	29

=== Top goalscorers ===
Rank	Name	Pos.	League		FA Cup		League Cup		FM Cup		Total		
Rank	Name	Pos.	Goals	Apps	Goals	Apps	Goals	Apps	Goals	Apps	Goals	Apps	GPG
1	Matt Le Tissier	MF	19	35	2	3	2	4	0	1	23	43	0.53
2	Rod Wallace	FW	14	37	2	5	2	5	1	1	19	48	0.40
3	Alan Shearer	FW	4	36	2	4	6	6	2	2	14	48	0.29
4	Paul Rideout	FW	6	16	0	2	0	2	0	1	6	21	0.29
5	Neil Ruddock	DF	3	35	1	3	1	4	0	2	5	44	0.11
6	Nicky Banger	FW	0	6	0	0	3	1	0	0	3	7	0.43
6	Barry Horne	MF	1	38	0	5	1	6	1	2	3	51	0.06
8	Jimmy Case	MF	1	25	1	3	4	4	0	0	2	32	0.06
8	Glenn Cockerill	MF	2	32	0	3	0	5	0	2	2	43	0.05
10	Alan McLoughlin	MF	1	22	0	4	0	0	0	1	1	27	0.04
10	Kevin Moore	DF	1	19	0	4	0	3	0	1	1	27	0.04
10	Russell Osman	DF	1	20	0	3	0	5	0	1	1	29	0.03

== Bibliography ==
- Holley, Duncan; Chalk, Gary (2003), Bull, David (ed.), In That Number: A Post-War Chronicle of Southampton FC, Bristol, England: Hagiology Publishing, ISBN 0-9534474-3-X
