= 1993–94 Southampton F.C. season =

Southampton F.C.
1993–94 season
- Chairman: Guy Askham
- Manager: Ian Branfoot (until 10 January 1994); Lew Chatterley and Dave Merrington (Note: Lew Chatterley and Dave Merrington served as temporary joint caretaker managers in between Ian Branfoot's sacking and Alan Ball's signing.) (10–20 January 1994); Alan Ball (from 20 January 1994)
- Stadium: The Dell
- FA Premier League: 18th
- FA Cup: Third round
- League Cup: Second round
- Top goalscorer: League: Matt Le Tissier (25); All: Matt Le Tissier (25)
- Highest home attendance: 19,105 v Blackburn; Rovers (16 April 1994)
- Lowest home attendance: 5,038 v Shrewsbury; Town (22 September 1993)
- Average home league attendance: 14,751
- Biggest win: 5–1 v Swindon Town (25 August 1993)
- Biggest defeat: 0–4 v Arsenal (19 March 1994)
Home colours	Away colours	Third colours

The 1993–94 Southampton F.C. season was the club's 93rd season of competitive football, their 24th in the top flight of English football, and their second in the FA Premier League. The season was another difficult one for the Saints, who finished 18th in the league – the same position as they had managed the year before – and were knocked out of both the FA Cup and the League Cup at the first hurdle – the first time this had happened to them in over ten years. It was the last season to feature manager Ian Branfoot, who was sacked halfway through the season with the club in the relegation zone. Dave Merrington briefly took over as caretaker manager, before Alan Ball was appointed as Branfoot's official replacement and saw out the rest of the campaign.

After buying them in the wake of Alan Shearer's sale just a year before, Branfoot released both David Speedie and Kerry Dixon at the beginning of the 1993–94 season. Other high-profile departures included Tim Flowers, who left in a record deal for a goalkeeper, and long-term midfielder Glenn Cockerill. Signings were made throughout the campaign, with arrivals including left-back Simon Charlton, goalkeeper Dave Beasant, and midfielder Jim Magilton. Southampton's league performance was disastrous, as they lost eight of their opening nine games and spent most of the first half of the season in the relegation zone. Results improved slightly following Ball's arrival as manager, although the club still struggled and ultimately only survived the drop by a single point.

Southampton's form outside the league was equally poor. For the first time since the 1981–82 season, the club were eliminated from both the FA Cup and the League Cup in the first rounds in which they competed. In the former, they were eliminated in the third round by Football League Second Division side Port Vale, who won a home replay 1–0 after holding the Saints to a 1–1 draw at The Dell (Branfoot's last game as manager of the club), despite a difference of two divisions between the clubs. In the latter, the top-flight side were eliminated in the second round by even lower-ranked opponents, facing a 2–1 aggregate defeat to Third Division side Shrewsbury Town after the Shrews overturned the Saints' narrow 1–0 home win with a 2–0 second leg victory.

Southampton used 31 players during the 1993–94 season and had 11 different goalscorers. Matt Le Tissier finished as the season's top scorer for the second consecutive (and fourth overall) season with 25 goals, all in the FA Premier League – making him the joint-third highest scorer in the division. Neil Maddison made the most appearances during the campaign, playing in all but one of the club's 46 matches (he missed just one league game). Le Tissier won the Southampton F.C. Player of the Season award for the second time, becoming the third player to do so. The average league attendance at The Dell in 1993–94 was 14,751. The highest attendance was 19,105 against Blackburn Rovers in April; the lowest was 5,038 against Shrewsbury Town in September.

== Background and transfers ==
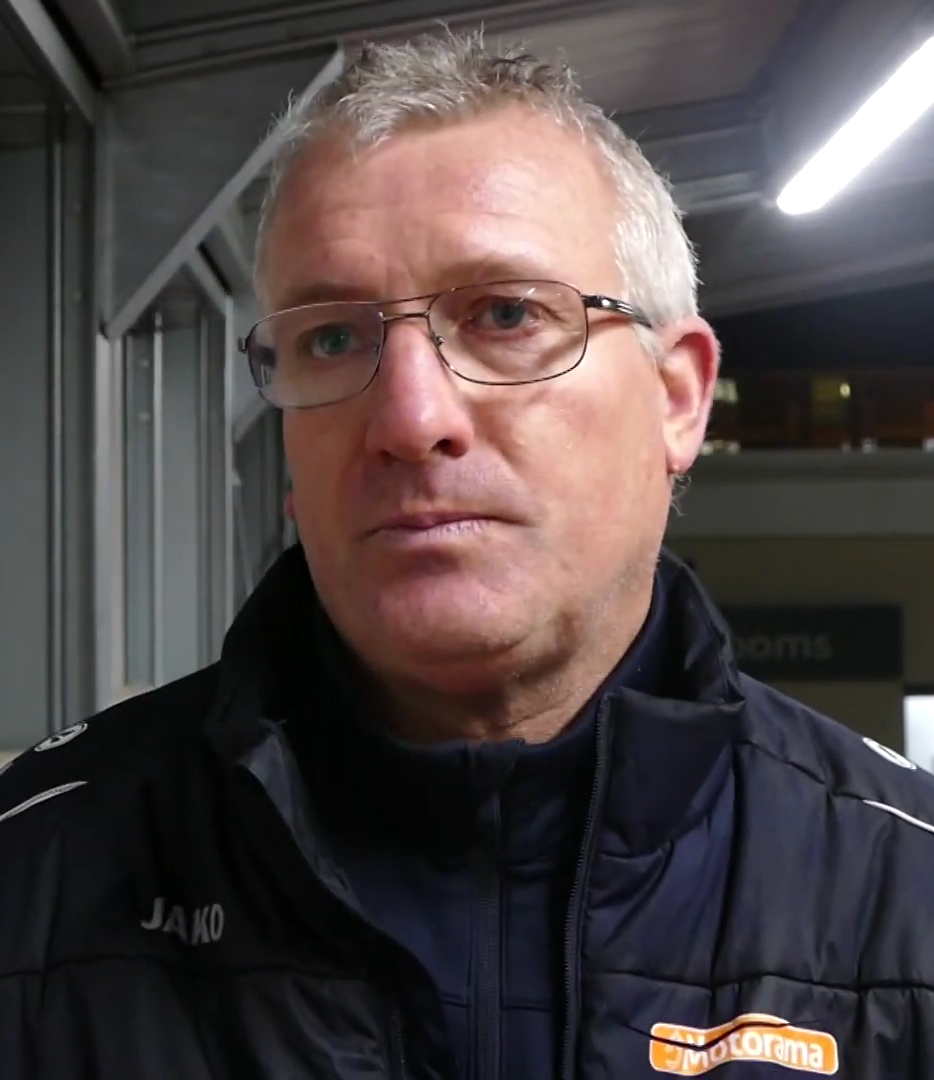
Two-time Southampton F.C. Player of the Season winner Tim Flowers moved to Blackburn Rovers in November for £2.4 million, a new British record transfer fee for a goalkeeper.

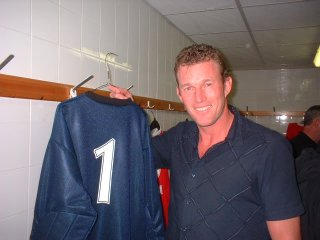
Flowers was replaced by Dave Beasant, who was signed from Chelsea for £300,000 on the same day as Flowers' sale.

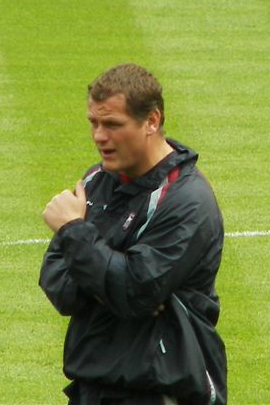
Northern Irish midfielder Jim Magilton signed from Oxford United just after Alan Ball took over as Saints manager in 1994.

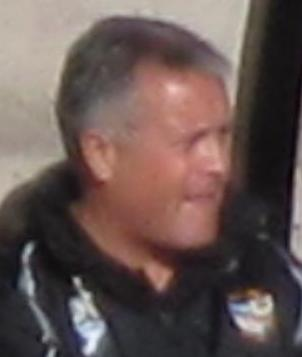
After five years at the club, Micky Adams was released on a free transfer by Southampton towards the end of 1993–94.

Ahead of the 1993–94 season, three of Southampton's major signings were released after just a year in the squad – winger Perry Groves, who had signed from Arsenal for £750,000 the previous August, retired from professional football due to an ongoing Achilles injury, joining young Conference side Dagenham & Redbridge in the summer of 1993; striker David Speedie, who had been "reluctantly" brought in from Blackburn Rovers for £400,000 and as part-exchange for Alan Shearer, joined Leicester City in August after several loan spells during 1992–93; and Kerry Dixon, another striker who was signed for £575,000 from Chelsea to help replace Shearer but spent much of his debut season out on loan, joined Luton Town on a free transfer in October after a brief loan spell. Also signed during the summer were Simon Charlton, who made the step up from Second Division club Huddersfield Town to take over as first-choice left-back; and youngsters Colin Cramb and Paul McDonald, who joined for a combined fee of £150,000 from Scottish side Hamilton Academical.

Manager Ian Branfoot continued to strengthen Southampton's squad throughout the first half of the season. After failing to re-sign Danny Wallace from Manchester United, as well as add right-back Tim Breacker and midfielder Ian Bishop from West Ham United, he eventually signed Paul Allen from Tottenham Hotspur in September for £500,000. Early the next month, the Saints brought in 37-year-old midfielder Peter Reid, who had just been sacked as player-manager at Manchester City. In November, after approaches from multiple clubs, the team sold Tim Flowers to Blackburn Rovers for £2.4 million – a new world record transfer fee for a goalkeeper. He was replaced the same day in the Southampton squad by Dave Beasant, who signed from Chelsea for £300,000. Two weeks before Christmas, veteran midfielder Glenn Cockerill left on a free transfer to Leyton Orient.

Just after the new year, Branfoot was sacked as Southampton manager and replaced by former player Alan Ball. Reid, who had only been with the club for four months, left on a free transfer for Notts County just after Branfoot's departure. Shortly after his arrival, Ball spent £850,000 on re-signing former Saints apprentice Craig Maskell from Swindon Town and adding Northern Irish midfielder Jim Magilton from Oxford United. He also offloaded several players from Branfoot's era, with Paul Moody sold to Oxford United for £60,000 and Terry Hurlock (to Millwall), Micky Adams (to Stoke City), Martin Thomas (to Leyton Orient), and Lee Powell (to Hamilton Academical) all released on free transfers. The last signing of the season was winger Neil Heaney, who joined from FA Premier League title challengers Arsenal in a £300,000 deal at the end of March.

Players transferred in

Name	Nationality	Pos.	Club	Date	Fee	Ref.
Simon Charlton	England	DF	(England) Huddersfield Town	8 June 1993	£250,000	
Colin Cramb	Scotland	FW	(Scotland) Hamilton Academical	8 June 1993	£150,000	
Paul McDonald	Scotland	MF	(Scotland) Hamilton Academical	8 June 1993	£150,000	
Matt Oakley	England	MF	Academy	July 1993	Free (Note: Matt Oakley joined as a trainee in July 1993, before turning professional in July 1995.)	
Paul Allen	England	MF	(England) Tottenham Hotspur	16 September 1993	£500,000	
Peter Reid	England	MF	(England) Manchester City	1 October 1993	Free	
Dave Beasant	England	GK	(England) Chelsea	4 November 1993	£300,000	
Shayne Bradley	England	FW	Academy	December 1993	Free (Note: Shayne Bradley joined as an associate schoolboy in December, before becoming an apprentice in December 1995 and turning professional in August 1998.)	
Craig Maskell	England	FW	(England) Swindon Town	7 February 1994	£250,000	
Jim Magilton	Northern Ireland	MF	(England) Oxford United	11 February 1994	£600,000	
Neil Heaney	England	MF	(England) Arsenal	22 March 1994	£300,000	

Players transferred out

Name	Nationality	Pos.	Club	Date	Fee	Ref.
Kerry Dixon	England	FW	(England) Luton Town	October 1993	Free	
Tim Flowers	England	GK	(England) Blackburn Rovers	4 November 1993	£2,400,000	
Glenn Cockerill	England	MF	(England) Leyton Orient	10 December 1993	Free	
Peter Reid	England	MF	(England) Notts County	2 February 1994	Free	
Paul Moody	England	MF	(England) Oxford United	19 February 1994	£60,000	
Terry Hurlock	England	MF	(England) Millwall	25 February 1994	Free	
Micky Adams	England	DF	(England) Stoke City	24 March 1994	Free	
Martin Thomas	England	MF	(England) Leyton Orient	24 March 1994	Free	
Lee Powell	Wales	MF	(Scotland) Hamilton Academical	March 1994	Free	

Players loaned out

Name	Nationality	Pos.	Club	Date from	Date to	Ref.
Matthew Bound	Wales	DF	(England) Hull City	27 August 1993	27 September 1993	
Kerry Dixon	England	FW	(England) Luton Town	August 1993	October 1993	

Players released

Name	Nationality	Pos.	Date	Subsequent club	Ref.
Perry Groves	England	MF	Start of season	(England) Dagenham & Redbridge	
David Speedie	Scotland	FW	Start of season	(England) Leicester City	

Players retired

Name	Nationality	Pos.	Date	Details	Ref.
Stuart Gray	England	MF	November 1993	Retired due to an ongoing injury, moved into coaching	

== Pre-season friendlies ==
Ahead of the 1993–94 campaign, Southampton played seven pre-season friendlies. Like the previous season, the club started their pre-season preparations with a short tour of Sweden, playing five games against local opposition over the course of eight days. After a 2–3 loss at Kalmar, the Saints picked up wins over Vessigebro (5–0, including a goal for new signing Paul McDonald), Örby (9–1, including five goals for Nicky Banger and three for Paul Moody), Växjö (2–1), and Bankeryd (4–3). The last two fixtures during the pre-season period were as part of the Memorial Pier Cesare Baretti, an Italian friendly tournament which served as a tribute to sports journalist Pier Cesare Baretti. Southampton lost both matches against Serie A opponents Juventus and Torino.

21 July 1993 Friendly	Kalmar	3–2	Southampton	Kalmar, Sweden
			Adams; Dowie	Stadium: Fredriksskans

24 July 1993 Friendly	Vessigebro	0–5	Southampton	Vessigebro, Sweden
			Banger; Dowie; Le Tissier; McDonald

26 July 1993 Friendly	Örby	1–9	Southampton	Örby, Sweden
			Banger; Le Tissier; Moody

27 July 1993 Friendly	Växjö	1–2	Southampton	Växjö, Sweden
			Cockerill; Maddison

29 July 1993 Friendly	Bankeryd	3–4	Southampton	Bankeryd, Sweden
			Adams; Banger; Maddison

5 August 1993 Trofeo Baretti	Juventus	3–1	Southampton
	Di Canio 63'; Baggio 83'; Möller 85'		Maddison 35'

7 August 1993 Trofeo Baretti	Torino	1–0	Southampton
	Poggi 86'

== FA Premier League ==
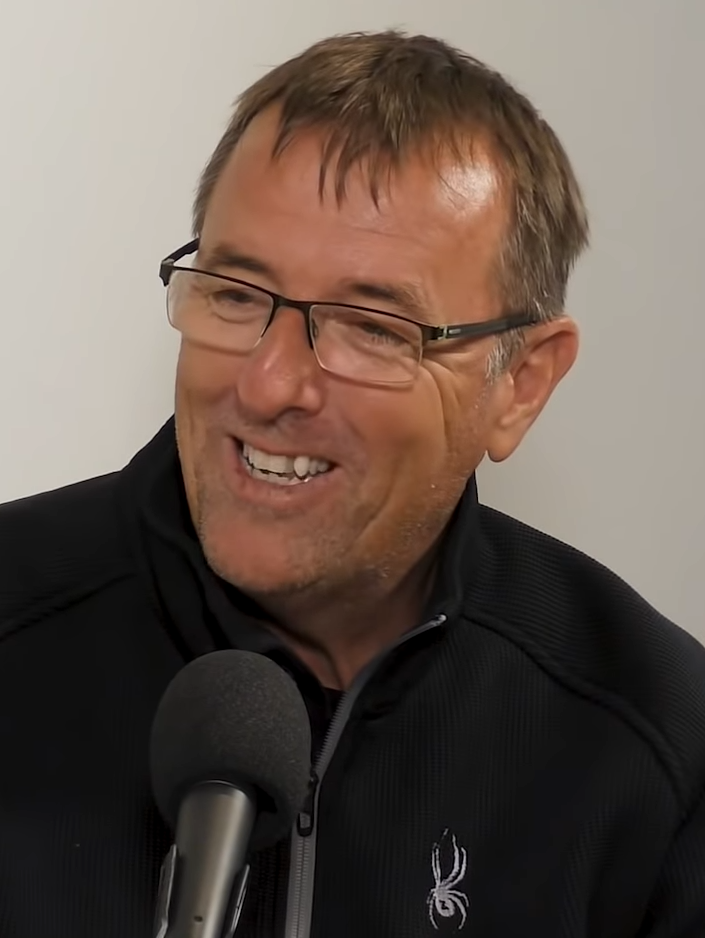
Matt Le Tissier finished as Southampton's top scorer for a fourth season and picked up his second Player of the Season award in the process.

Southampton had a worse start to the second FA Premier League season than any other team in the division, losing their first three games and dropping to the bottom of the table. After an opening day 0–2 loss at home to Everton described by the Southern Daily Echo as "humiliating and desperately worrying", the Saints also lost away to Ipswich Town (0–1) and Queens Park Rangers (1–2). Despite this poor start, the side then picked up their first win (and biggest of the season) when they beat top-flight newcomers Swindon Town 5–1 at The Dell, with a first-half Matt Le Tissier goal followed by four more in the second half courtesy of Le Tissier again, Jeff Kenna, Iain Dowie and Neil Maddison.

The club's time out of the drop zone was short-lived, however, as they soon returned to the relegation spots with a run of five consecutive defeats (for the first time since 1989). The dry spell included three away and two home defeats, during which time the Saints scored just one goal and conceded nine. The Saints' one goal during this period came in the first defeat at home to defending league champions Manchester United, when Neil Maddison scored a consolation after two of United's three goals. This was followed by a 0–1 defeat at Wimbledon, a 0–2 loss hosting Leeds United, another 0–2 loss at Sheffield Wednesday, and a 0–1 defeat at title challengers Arsenal. Amongst these fixtures, Southampton fans arranged protests against Ian Branfoot remaining as manager of the club, in response to which chairman Guy Askham assured that he would see out the season.

Following the run of six defeats, Southampton picked up their first point in over a month in a 3–3 draw with fellow strugglers Sheffield United. After leading 1–0 at half-time through Ken Monkou, the Saints received another advantage just after the break when the visitors went down to ten men; despite this, however, the hosts sacrificed a 3–1 lead in the last ten minutes of the game, when Jostein Flo scored twice to secure his side a share of the points. A 1–1 draw with Coventry City was followed by the South Coast club's second win of the campaign, 2–1 against high-flyers Newcastle United, in which Matt Le Tissier scored both goals through "two moments of sheer magic" according to club historians. The club's leading goalscorer picked up another brace a week later, when the Saints lost 2–4 to Liverpool at Anfield, in a game which marked the final appearance of Tim Flowers.

Two more wins in their next three games saw Southampton climb out of the relegation zone for the first time since September. After the Liverpool defeat, the Saints picked up a narrow 1–0 win over a struggling Tottenham Hotspur side, with Maddison scoring the only goal of the game on the hour mark, heading in a chipped assist by Le Tissier. After a 0–2 loss at Blackburn Rovers in which former Saint Alan Shearer scored both goals, the team beat Aston Villa by the same scoreline thanks to another pair of goals from Le Tissier. The win over Villa saw Southampton move up to 19th in the table for the first time in almost three months. The club's safety was short-lived, however, as they lost their next five games and dropped back to second-from-bottom in the league table, suffering defeats at the hands of Everton (0–1), Ipswich Town (0–1), Queens Park Rangers (0–1), and bottom-placed Swindon Town (1–2) in the run-up to Christmas. In the days after Christmas, Southampton picked up four points from a possible six, beating Chelsea 3–1 at home and drawing 1–1 with Manchester City at Maine Road, with Iain Dowie scoring in both games (his first goals in any competition since August).

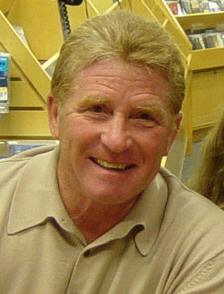
Former Saints player Alan Ball took over from Ian Branfoot as the club's manager in January 1994, seeing out the season and helping them avoid relegation.

After a 0–1 New Year's Day loss at home to top-six side Norwich City and a poor performance in their opening FA Cup match against Second Division side Port Vale, Southampton parted ways with manager Ian Branfoot on 10 January 1994. Whilst the club looked for a replacement, they were temporarily managed by coaches Lew Chatterley and Dave Merrington, who oversaw a 1–0 home win over Coventry City decided by a Le Tissier penalty on the stroke of half-time. Rumoured successors for Branfoot's position included former England manager Graham Taylor and former Saints players Alan Ball and Peter Shilton, who were managing South West sides Exeter City and Plymouth Argyle, respectively, at the time. On 20 January, it was Ball who officially took over the role, while former manager Lawrie McMenemy also became the club's "general manager".

Ball's first game in charge of Southampton took place two days after his arrival, as the club (sitting 21st in the table) travelled to face third-placed Newcastle United. After opening the scoring just five minutes in through Maddison, but going into half-time level after an Andy Cole equaliser shortly before the break, the Saints secured a "memorable win" when Le Tissier scored a "stunning free kick" in the 83rd minute. A marginal 1–2 loss against fellow relegation risks Oldham Athletic followed, before Southampton faced top side Liverpool in their first home game under Ball. The hosts opened the scoring after just 28 seconds through Le Tissier and were 2–0 up within eight minutes when the returning Craig Maskell scored on his first game since re-signing the previous week. Le Tissier made it 3–0 with a penalty for a foul just before half-time, before repeating the feat again shortly after the break following a handball to complete his hat-trick and extend Southampton's lead to 4–0 – Liverpool would pick up two late consolation goals through Julian Dicks and Ian Rush.

Beating Wimbledon 1–0 two weeks after the Liverpool win saw Southampton rise to 17th in the FA Premier League table – the highest position they would reach all season. After the positive start to Ball's tenure, however, the Saints would not pick up another win in their next seven games. Two "scrappy" draws against Leeds United and Sheffield Wednesday preceded the side's heaviest defeat of the season, 0–4 at home to Arsenal, in which Ian Wright scored a hat-trick. They subsequently dropped points against four teams in a row that were also facing the threat of relegation, drawing 0–0 at Sheffield United before losing 1–3 at home to Oldham Athletic, 0–2 at Chelsea and 0–1 at home to Manchester City – a run of results which had seen them drop back to 21st in the table, with only six games left (only two of which were at The Dell).

On 9 April, Southampton faced Norwich City at Carrow Road, coming from behind four times throughout the match to win 5–4; Le Tissier scored a third away hat-trick in the second half, as well as setting up Monkou's last-minute winner with a corner. This was followed by a 3–1 home win over Blackburn Rovers, who were just three points behind Manchester United at the top of the table, which saw the Saints move back up to 19th out of the relegation zone. After a 0–3 loss at fellow strugglers Tottenham Hotspur, the club moved back up to 17th with a 4–1 home win over Aston Villa in which Le Tissier (who scored twice) was joined on the scoresheet by Monkou and Maddison, both of whom were assisted by the newly-named Player of the Season. The final two games of the season saw Southampton lose 0–2 to Manchester United and draw 3–3 with West Ham United – the latter enough to secure FA Premier League safety due to results elsewhere. Like the season before, Southampton survived relegation by a single point.

=== List of match results ===
14 August 1993 1	Southampton	0–2	Everton	Southampton
			Beagrie 10'; Ebbrell 45'	Stadium: The Dell; Attendance: 14,051; Referee: Keith Cooper

17 August 1993 2	Ipswich Town	1–0	Southampton	Ipswich
	Marshall 58'			Stadium: Portman Road; Attendance: 14,958; Referee: Alan Wilkie

21 August 1993 3	Queens Park Rangers	2–1	Southampton	London
	Penrice 13'; Wilson 46' (pen.)		Dowie 88'	Stadium: Loftus Road; Attendance: 10,613; Referee: Roger Dilkes

25 August 1993 4	Southampton	5–1	Swindon Town	Southampton
	Le Tissier 12', 50'; Kenna 56'; Dowie 62'; Maddison 79'		Maskell 83' (pen.)	Stadium: The Dell; Attendance: 12,505; Referee: Paul Durkin

28 August 1993 5	Southampton	1–3	Manchester United	Southampton
	Maddison 12'		Sharpe 5'; Cantona 15'; Irwin 49'	Stadium: The Dell; Attendance: 16,189; Referee: Alan Gunn

31 August 1993 6	Wimbledon	1–0	Southampton	London
	Barton 34'			Stadium: Selhurst Park; Attendance: 6,036; Referee: Keith Hackett

11 September 1993 7	Southampton	0–2	Leeds United	Southampton
			Deane 50'; Speed 90'	Stadium: The Dell; Attendance: 13,511; Referee: Keith Burge

18 September 1993 8	Sheffield Wednesday	2–0	Southampton	Sheffield
	Sheridan 58' (pen.); Hirst 80'			Stadium: Hillsborough Stadium; Attendance: 22,503; Referee: Rodger Gifford

25 September 1993 9	Arsenal	1–0	Southampton	London
	Merson 45'			Stadium: Arsenal Stadium; Attendance: 26,902; Referee: Kelvin Morton

2 October 1993 10	Southampton	3–3	Sheffield United	Southampton
	Monkou 29'; Maddison 53'; Kenna 77'		Falconer 72'; Flo 80', 90'	Stadium: The Dell; Attendance: 11,619; Referee: Graham Poll

16 October 1993 11	Coventry City	1–1	Southampton	Coventry
	Babb 87'		Charlton 56'	Stadium: Highfield Road; Attendance: 9,837; Referee: Joe Worrall

24 October 1993 12	Southampton	2–1	Newcastle United	Southampton
	Le Tissier 62', 87'		Cole 72'	Stadium: The Dell; Attendance: 13,804; Referee: Philip Don

30 October 1993 13	Liverpool	4–2	Southampton	Liverpool
	Fowler 14', 29', 85'; Rush 63'		Le Tissier 40', 79'	Stadium: Anfield; Attendance: 32,818; Referee: Dermot Gallagher

6 November 1993 14	Southampton	1–0	Tottenham Hotspur	Southampton
	Maddison 60'			Stadium: The Dell; Attendance: 16,017; Referee: David Allison

20 November 1993 15	Blackburn Rovers	2–0	Southampton	Blackburn
	Shearer 24' (pen.), 77'			Stadium: Ewood Park; Attendance: 17,434; Referee: Keith Cooper

24 November 1993 16	Aston Villa	0–2	Southampton	Birmingham
			Le Tissier 50', 62'	Stadium: Villa Park; Attendance: 16,180; Referee: Kelvin Morton

29 November 1993 17	Southampton	0–2	West Ham United	Southampton
			Morley 30'; Chapman 38'	Stadium: The Dell; Attendance: 13,258; Referee: Martin Bodenham

4 December 1993 18	Everton	1–0	Southampton	Liverpool
	Cottee 35'			Stadium: Goodison Park; Attendance: 13,265; Referee: Keith Burge

8 December 1993 19	Southampton	0–1	Ipswich Town	Southampton
			Kiwomya 54'	Stadium: The Dell; Attendance: 9,028; Referee: Gerald Ashby

11 December 1993 20	Southampton	0–1	Queens Park Rangers	Southampton
			Ferdinand 2'	Stadium: The Dell; Attendance: 11,946; Referee: Keren Barratt

18 December 1993 21	Swindon Town	2–1	Southampton	Swindon
	Bodin 11'; Scott 65'		Le Tissier 38'	Stadium: County Ground; Attendance: 13,565; Referee: David Elleray

27 December 1993 22	Southampton	3–1	Chelsea	Southampton
	Widdrington 28'; Dowie 65'; Bennett 89'		Stein 42'	Stadium: The Dell; Attendance: 14,221; Referee: Paul Durkin

28 December 1993 23	Manchester City	1–1	Southampton	Manchester
	Phelan 29'		Dowie 26'	Stadium: Maine Road; Attendance: 24,712; Referee: Alan Wilkie

1 January 1994 24	Southampton	0–1	Norwich City	Southampton
			Sutton 45'	Stadium: The Dell; Attendance: 16,556; Referee: Graham Poll

15 January 1994 25	Southampton	1–0	Coventry City	Southampton
	Le Tissier 44' (pen.)			Stadium: The Dell; Attendance: 12,397; Referee: Philip Don

22 January 1994 26	Newcastle United	1–2	Southampton	Newcastle upon Tyne
	Cole 38'		Maddison 5'; Le Tissier 83'	Stadium: St James' Park; Attendance: 32,067; Referee: Alan Gunn

5 February 1994 27	Oldham Athletic	2–1	Southampton	Oldham
	McCarthy 33'; Bernard 38'		Le Tissier 26'	Stadium: Boundary Park; Attendance: 9,982; Referee: Kelvin Morton

14 February 1994 28	Southampton	4–2	Liverpool	Southampton
	Le Tissier 1', 42' (pen.), 50' (pen.); Maskell 6'		Dicks 69' (pen.); Rush 86'	Stadium: The Dell; Attendance: 18,306; Referee: Peter Foakes

26 February 1994 29	Southampton	1–0	Wimbledon	Southampton
	Le Tissier 74'			Stadium: The Dell; Attendance: 14,790; Referee: Dermot Gallagher

5 March 1994 30	Leeds United	0–0	Southampton	Leeds
				Stadium: Elland Road; Attendance: 30,829; Referee: Robbie Hart

12 March 1994 31	Southampton	1–1	Sheffield Wednesday	Southampton
	Monkou 78'		Bart-Williams 67'	Stadium: The Dell; Attendance: 16,391; Referee: David Crick

19 March 1994 32	Southampton	0–4	Arsenal	Southampton
			Wright 12', 30', 69' (pen.); Campbell 85'	Stadium: The Dell; Attendance: 16,790; Referee: David Frampton

26 March 1994 33	Sheffield United	0–0	Southampton	Sheffield
				Stadium: Bramall Lane; Attendance: 19,522; Referee: David Elleray

30 March 1994 34	Southampton	1–3	Oldham Athletic	Southampton
	Le Tissier 58'		Sharp 13'; Benali 42' (o.g.); Holden 88'	Stadium: The Dell; Attendance: 14,101; Referee: Vic Callow

2 April 1994 35	Chelsea	2–0	Southampton	London
	Spencer 45'; Johnsen 80'			Stadium: Stamford Bridge; Attendance: 19,801; Referee: Mike Reed

4 April 1994 36	Southampton	0–1	Manchester City	Southampton
			Karl 88'	Stadium: The Dell; Attendance: 16,377; Referee: Brian Hill

9 April 1994 37	Norwich City	4–5	Southampton	Norwich
	Robins 37'; Goss 48'; Sutton 55', 63'		Ullathorne 44' (o.g.); Le Tissier 57', 63' (pen.), 72'; Monkou 90'	Stadium: Carrow Road; Attendance: 17,150; Referee: Keith Cooper

16 April 1994 38	Southampton	3–1	Blackburn Rovers	Southampton
	Dowie 28'; Allen 38'; Le Tissier 69' (pen.)		Ripley 48'	Stadium: The Dell; Attendance: 19,105; Referee: Joe Worrall

23 April 1994 39	Tottenham Hotspur	3–0	Southampton	London
	Sedgley 4'; Samways 66'; Anderton 88'			Stadium: White Hart Lane; Attendance: 25,959; Referee: Paul Durkin

30 April 1994 40	Southampton	4–1	Aston Villa	Southampton
	Le Tissier 19', 76'; Monkou 31'; Maddison 85'		Saunders 57'	Stadium: The Dell; Attendance: 18,803; Referee: Steve Lodge

4 May 1994 41	Manchester United	2–0	Southampton	Manchester
	Kanchelskis 60'; Hughes 89'			Stadium: Old Trafford; Attendance: 44,705; Referee: Terry Holbrook

7 May 1994 42	West Ham United	3–3	Southampton	London
	Williamson 11'; Allen 62'; Chapman 89'		Le Tissier 45', 65' (pen.); Maddison 52'	Stadium: Boleyn Ground; Attendance: 26,952; Referee: Gerald Ashby

=== Final league table ===
Pos	Team	Pld	W	D	L	GF	GA	GD	Pts	Qualification or relegation
16	Manchester City	42	9	18	15	38	49	−11	45	
17	Everton	42	12	8	22	42	63	−21	44	
18	Southampton	42	12	7	23	49	66	−17	43	
19	Ipswich Town	42	9	16	17	35	58	−23	43	
20	Sheffield United (R)	42	8	18	16	42	60	−18	42	Relegation to Football League First Division

Source: RSSSF
Rules for classification: 1) points; 2) goal difference; 3) number of goals scored.
(R) Relegated

=== Results by matchday ===
Round	1	2	3	4	5	6	7	8	9	10	11	12	13	14	15	16	17	18	19	20	21	22	23	24	25	26	27	28	29	30	31	32	33	34	35	36	37	38	39	40	41	42
Ground	H	A	A	H	H	A	H	A	A	H	A	H	A	H	A	A	H	A	H	H	A	H	A	H	H	A	A	H	H	A	H	H	A	H	A	H	A	H	A	H	A	A
Result	L	L	L	W	L	L	L	L	L	D	D	W	L	W	L	W	L	L	L	L	L	W	D	L	W	W	L	W	W	D	D	L	D	L	L	L	W	W	L	W	L	D
Position	17	20	22	18	19	19	20	21	21	21	21	20	21	20	20	19	20	21	21	21	21	20	20	21	20	18	19	17	17	18	18	18	18	20	21	21	20	19	19	17	17	18

Source: 11v11.com
A = Away; H = Home; W = Win; D = Draw; L = Loss

== FA Cup ==
Southampton entered the 1993–94 FA Cup, drawn against Second Division side Port Vale. The last game in charge for Ian Branfoot, the tie took place at The Dell but saw the visitors "outplaying" the hosts from early on; in the 14th minute, Andy Porter scored a free kick to put his third-flight side ahead, after goalkeeper Dave Beasant made a mistake. Despite failing to increase the pressure in any noticeable fashion, the Saints equalised just before half-time through Iain Dowie, who converted a chance created by Tommy Widdrington. The second half brought no goals for either side, forcing a replay ten days later. With caretaker managers Lew Chatterley and Dave Merrington leading for their second and final game, Southampton were eliminated by a single goal scored in the 18th minute by Bernie Slaven.

8 January 1994 Round 3	Southampton	1–1	Port Vale	Southampton
	Dowie 43'		Porter 14'	Stadium: The Dell; Attendance: 11,086

18 January 1994 Round 3 replay	Port Vale	1–0	Southampton	Stoke-on-Trent
	Slaven 18'			Stadium: Vale Park; Attendance: 12,042

== League Cup ==
Southampton entered the second round of the 1993–94 League Cup against Shrewsbury Town, who were playing in the fourth flight of English football, the Third Division. After winning the first leg 1–0 thanks to a first-half goal from Kevin Moore, the top-flight Saints were eliminated after a 0–2 loss at Gay Meadow in the return leg, marking the first time since 1987–88 they had been knocked out at the first hurdle.

22 September 1993 Round 2 Leg 1	Southampton	1–0	Shrewsbury Town	Southampton
	Moore 24'			Stadium: The Dell; Attendance: 5,038

6 October 1993 Round 2 Leg 2	Shrewsbury Town	2–0	Southampton	Shrewsbury
	Summerfield 36'; Brown 71'			Stadium: Gay Meadow; Attendance: 5,247

== Other matches ==
Outside the league, FA Cup and League Cup, the Southampton first team played four additional matches during the 1993–94 season. The first was a 4–0 friendly win over Welsh Conference side Merthyr Tydfil in December, which was followed by a 3–0 home win over Swedish side Göteborg in January and a 2–1 win over Southend United of the First Division in February. The final game of the season came three days after the league's conclusion and saw the Saints face nearby rivals Portsmouth for the first time since 1988, in a testimonial for goalkeeper Alan Knight. The FA Premier League side won the friendly match 5–1, with first-half goals from Iain Dowie and Neil Maddison followed by second-half additions from Craig Maskell, Jeff Kenna and David Hughes. Knight himself scored Pompey's consolation goal just before being substituted off, converting a penalty given for a foul by Francis Benali on striker Guy Whittingham. Late in the game, Southampton manager Alan Ball played a few minutes himself.

13 December 1993 Friendly	(Wales) Merthyr Tydfil	0–4	Southampton	Merthyr Tydfil, Wales
			Dowie; Hughes; Robinson	Stadium: Penydarren Park

31 January 1994 Friendly	Southampton	3–0	(Sweden) Göteborg	Southampton
	Le Tissier; Dowie			Stadium: The Dell

18 February 1994 Friendly	Southend United	1–2	Southampton	Southend-on-Sea
			Dowie; Le Tissier	Stadium: Roots Hall

10 May 1994 Alan Knight Testimonial	Portsmouth	1–5	Southampton	Portsmouth
	Knight (pen.)		Dowie 16'; Kenna 65'; Maddison; Maskell; Hughes 80'	Stadium: Fratton Park; Attendance: 16,831; Referee: Mick Pierce

== Player details ==
Southampton used 31 players during the 1993–94 season, 11 of whom scored during the campaign. Ten players made their debut appearances for the club, including eight of their nine first team signings (Paul Allen, Dave Beasant, Simon Charlton, Colin Cramb, Neil Heaney, Craig Maskell, Jim Magilton, and Peter Reid), one signing from the previous season (Frankie Bennett), and one player making the step up from youth to the first team (David Hughes). Two of these – Cramb and Reid – also made their last appearances for the Saints during the campaign, as did mid-season departees Micky Adams, Glenn Cockerill, Tim Flowers, Terry Hurlock, Paul Moody, and Lee Powell, plus five more players sold the following season: Ian Andrews, Neal Bartlett, Matthew Bound, Kevin Moore, and Steve Wood. Midfielder Neil Maddison made the most appearances for Southampton during 1993–94, playing in all but one league game during the campaign. Matt Le Tissier was the club's top goalscorer again, with 25 goals in the league. Le Tissier also won the Southampton F.C. Player of the Season award, becoming the third player (and the first outfield player) to receive the accolade for a second time.

=== Squad statistics ===
No.	Name	Pos.	Nat.	League		FA Cup		League Cup		Total		Discipline	
No.	Name	Pos.	Nat.	Apps.	Goals	Apps.	Goals	Apps.	Goals	Apps.	Goals	Yellow card	Red card
1	Dave Beasant	GK	(England)	25	0	2	0	0	0	27	0	1	0
2	Jeff Kenna	DF	(Republic of Ireland)	40(1)	2	1	0	1	0	42(1)	2	4	0
4	Jim Magilton	MF	(Northern Ireland)	15	0	0	0	0	0	15	0	0	0
5	Richard Hall	DF	(England)	4	0	0	0	1	0	5	0	0	0
6	Ken Monkou	DF	(Netherlands)	35	4	2	0	1	0	38	4	5	0
7	Matt Le Tissier	MF	(England)	38	25	2	0	0	0	40	25	5	0
8	Craig Maskell	FW	(England)	6(4)	1	0	0	0	0	6(4)	1	0	0
9	Iain Dowie	FW	(Northern Ireland)	39	5	2	1	2	0	43	6	8	0
10	Neil Maddison	MF	(England)	41	7	2	0	2	0	45	7	2	0
11	Francis Benali	DF	(England)	34(3)	0	1	0	2	0	37(3)	0	3	1
12	Neil Heaney	MF	(England)	2	0	0	0	0	0	2	0	0	0
13	Ian Andrews	GK	(England)	5	0	0	0	0	0	5	0	0	0
14	Simon Charlton	DF	(England)	29(4)	1	1	0	1	0	31(4)	1	1	0
15	Jason Dodd	DF	(England)	5(5)	0	2	0	0	0	7(5)	0	1	0
16	Nicky Banger	FW	(England)	4(10)	0	0(1)	0	0(1)	0	4(12)	0	1	0
17	Kevin Moore	DF	(England)	14	0	1	0	2	1	17	1	0	0
18	Steve Wood	DF	(England)	27	0	1	0	1(1)	0	29(1)	0	2	0
19	Paul McDonald	DF	(Scotland)	0	0	0	0	0	0	0	0	0	0
21	Tommy Widdrington	MF	(England)	11	1	2	0	0	0	13	1	2	0
22	Matthew Bound	DF	(England)	1	0	0	0	0	0	1	0	0	0
23	Neil Hopper	GK	(England)	0	0	0	0	0	0	0	0	0	0
24	Frankie Bennett	FW	(England)	0(8)	1	0(1)	0	1	0	1(9)	1	0	0
25	Neal Bartlett	MF	(England)	4(3)	0	0	0	0(1)	0	4(4)	0	0	0
27	Paul Allen	MF	(England)	29(3)	1	2	0	2	0	33(3)	1	5	0
29	David Hughes	MF	(England)	0(2)	0	0	0	0	0	0(2)	0	0	0
30	Colin Cramb	FW	(Scotland)	0(1)	0	0	0	0	0	0(1)	0	0	0
Squad members who left before the end of the season
1	Tim Flowers	GK	(England)	12	0	0	0	2	0	14	0	0	0
3	Micky Adams	DF	(England)	17(2)	0	1	0	1	0	19(2)	0	2	0
4	Terry Hurlock	MF	(England)	2	0	0	0	0	0	2	0	1	0
8	Glenn Cockerill	MF	(England)	12(2)	0	1(1)	0	0	0	13(3)	0	0	0
20	Paul Moody	FW	(England)	3(2)	0	0	0	1	0	4(2)	0	0	0
26	Lee Powell	FW	(Wales)	1	0	0	0	0	0	1	0	0	0
28	Peter Reid	MF	(England)	7	0	0	0	1	0	8	0	0	0
—	Martin Thomas	MF	(England)	0	0	0	0	0	0	0	0	0	0

=== Most appearances ===
Rank	Name	Pos.	League		FA Cup		League Cup		Total		
Rank	Name	Pos.	Starts	Subs	Starts	Subs	Starts	Subs	Starts	Subs	Total
1	Neil Maddison	MF	41	0	2	0	2	0	45	0	45
2	Iain Dowie	FW	39	0	2	0	2	0	43	0	43
2	Jeff Kenna	DF	40	1	1	0	1	0	42	1	43
4	Matt Le Tissier	MF	38	0	2	0	0	0	40	0	40
4	Francis Benali	DF	34	3	1	0	2	0	37	3	40
6	Ken Monkou	DF	35	0	2	0	1	0	38	0	38
7	Paul Allen	MF	29	3	2	0	2	0	33	3	36
8	Simon Charlton	DF	29	4	1	0	1	0	31	4	35
9	Steve Wood	DF	27	0	1	0	1	1	29	1	30
10	Dave Beasant	GK	25	0	2	0	0	0	27	0	27

=== Top goalscorers ===
Rank	Name	Pos.	League		FA Cup		League Cup		Total		
Rank	Name	Pos.	Goals	Apps	Goals	Apps	Goals	Apps	Goals	Apps	GPG
1	Matt Le Tissier	FW	25	38	0	2	0	0	25	40	0.63
2	Neil Maddison	MF	7	41	0	2	0	2	7	45	0.16
3	Iain Dowie	FW	5	39	1	2	0	2	6	43	0.14
4	Ken Monkou	DF	4	35	0	2	0	1	4	38	0.11
5	Jeff Kenna	DF	2	40	0	1	0	1	2	42	0.05
6	Frankie Bennett	FW	1	8	0	1	0	1	1	10	0.10
6	Craig Maskell	FW	1	10	0	0	0	0	1	10	0.10
6	Tommy Widdrington	MF	1	11	0	2	0	0	1	13	0.08
6	Kevin Moore	DF	0	14	0	1	1	2	1	17	0.06
6	Simon Charlton	DF	1	33	0	1	0	1	1	35	0.03
6	Paul Allen	MF	1	32	0	2	0	2	1	36	0.03

== Bibliography ==
- Holley, Duncan; Chalk, Gary (2003), Bull, David (ed.), In That Number: A Post-War Chronicle of Southampton FC, Bristol, England: Hagiology Publishing, ISBN 0-9534474-3-X
- Juson, Dave; Aldworth, Clay; Bendel, Barry; Bull, David; Chalk, Gary (10 November 2004), Saints v Pompey: A History of Unrelenting Rivalry, Bristol, England: Hagiology Publishing, ISBN 978-0953447459
