= Neil Maddison =

English footballer

Personal information
- Full name: Neil Stanley Maddison
- Date of birth: 2 October 1969 (age 57)
- Place of birth: Darlington, England
- Height: 5 ft 10 in (1.78 m)
- Position: Central midfielder

Team information
- Current team: Middlesbrough (Academy Ambassador)

Youth career
- 1984–1988: Southampton

Senior career*
Years	Team	Apps	(Gls)
1988–1997	Southampton	169	(19)
1997–2001	Middlesbrough	56	(4)
2000	→ Barnsley (loan)	3	(0)
2001	→ Bristol City (loan)	7	(1)
2001–2007	Darlington	115	(4)
Total		350	(28)

Managerial career
- 2006: Darlington (joint caretaker)
- 2009: Darlington (joint caretaker)
- 2010: Darlington (joint caretaker)
- * Club domestic league appearances and goals

Neil Stanley Maddison (born 2 October 1969) is an English football coach, former professional footballer and co-commentator. He is the academy ambassador and player welfare officer at Middlesbrough.

As a player, he was predominantly a central midfield who notably played in the Premier League for Southampton and Middlesbrough, before going on to play in the Football League with Barnsley, Bristol City and Darlington.

He would initially remain with Darlington following the end of his playing career and worked in a variety of roles at the club, as well as managing the first team on a temporary basis on three occasions. He has since worked with the Middlesbrough academy and has co-commentated on games for BBC Tees since the start of the 2013–14 season.

== Playing career ==
Over the course of his nearly two-decade career, Neil Maddison was a versatile professional football player who played mostly as a central midfielder but was renowned for his ability to cover nearly any outfield position. Before making his senior debut in the late 1980s, he started his career with Southampton as a trainee in 1984 and progressed through the youth ranks. Maddison made over 160 league appearances and scored almost 20 goals during his nine years at The Dell, establishing himself as a dependable member of the team. He was known for his aerial skills and his propensity to make late, risky runs into the opposition penalty area during his most productive years on the South Coast, which also happened to be the early years of the Premier League.

Maddison paid a £250,000 transfer fee to join Middlesbrough in 1997. During a time of major change and aspiration for the Teesside club, he joined a prominent squad. His appearance at Wembley Stadium in the 1998 League Cup Final against Chelsea was one of the most memorable moments of his time with Boro. Even though Middlesbrough lost the game in extra time, it was still one of his career's most memorable moments. He played alongside well-known international players like Paul Gascoigne and made over 50 league appearances during his four years at the Riverside Stadium.

In order to maintain match fitness and offer veteran experience, Maddison had brief loan stints with Barnsley and Bristol City as his time at Middlesbrough came to an end. He signed with his hometown team, Darlington, in 2001, making an emotional return to his roots. He led and stabilised the lower leagues during the last six years of his playing career with the Quakers. After making over 350 league appearances in all English football divisions, he formally retired from professional play in 2007. He then went on to work as a coach and in the media.

== Coaching career ==
On 30 September 2006, David Hodgson was suspended by the club following a run of poor results and a possible approach from AFC Bournemouth, leaving Maddison and Martin Gray as joint caretakers for up to two weeks while an internal investigation was carried out. He remained in charge until Dave Penney was appointed on 30 October. On 5 January 2007, Darlington agreed to end Maddison's playing contract so he could concentrate on being youth coach full-time.

In February 2008, after Mick Tait had left Darlington, Maddison took over the role as reserve team coach with Craig Liddle taking the role of youth team coach.

On 8 May 2009, it was reported that Darlington's administrators, Brackenbury Clark and Company, had released the majority of the first team squad from their contracts to cut costs, with immediate effect, as well as the club's coaching staff and administrative staff including the caretaker manager Martin Gray, leaving Liddle and Maddison as joint temporary caretaker managers. They remained in these posts until Colin Todd was appointed on 20 May.

In May 2009, Maddison was appointed Darlington's centre of excellence manager.

After Todd was dismissed from Darlington, Maddison was appointed to assist Liddle as temporary caretaker assistant manager as Liddle was appointed caretaker manager.

On 5 October 2009, the former Republic of Ireland manager Steve Staunton took over as the new permanent manager until the end of that season with the former Sunderland coach Kevin Richardson as his assistant. On 21 March 2010, Maddison joined Liddle as caretaker yet again after the sacking of Staunton, before Simon Davey was appointed manager on 1 April.

Since September 2018, Maddison has worked for Middlesbrough as their academy ambassador and player welfare officer.

== Media career ==
Maddison has worked for BBC Tees as a co-commentator on Middlesbrough games.

== Career statistics ==
Appearances and goals by club, season and competition
Club	Season	League			FA Cup		League Cup		Other		Total	
Club	Season	Division	Apps	Goals	Apps	Goals	Apps	Goals	Apps	Goals	Apps	Goals
Southampton
Southampton	1988–89	First Division	5	2	0	0	0	0	—		5	2
Southampton	1989–90	First Division	2	0	1	0	0	0	—		3	0
Southampton	1990–91	First Division	4	0	1	0	0	0	1 (Note: Appearances in Full Members' Cup)	0	6	0
Southampton	1991–92	First Division	6	0	1	0	1	0	—		8	0
Southampton	1992–93	Premier League	37	4	1	0	1	0	—		39	4
Southampton	1993–94	Premier League	41	7	2	0	2	0	—		45	7
Southampton	1994–95	Premier League	35	3	4	0	2	0	—		41	3
Southampton	1995–96	Premier League	15	1	2	0	3	0	—		20	1
Southampton	1996–97	Premier League	18	1	1	0	4	0	—		23	1
Southampton	1997–98	Premier League	6	1	0	0	0	0	—		6	1
Southampton	Total		169	19	13	0	13	0	1	0	195	19
Middlesbrough
Middlesbrough	1997–98	First Division	22	4	3	0	4	0	—		29	4
Middlesbrough	1998–99	Premier League	21	0	1	0	1	0	—		23	0
Middlesbrough	1999–2000	Premier League	13	0	0	0	2	0	—		15	0
Middlesbrough	2000–01	Premier League	0	0	0	0	1	0	—		1	0
Middlesbrough	Total		56	4	4	0	8	0	0	0	68	4
Barnsley (loan)	2000–01	First Division	3	0	0	0	0	0	—		3	0
Bristol City (loan)	2000–01	Second Division	7	1	0	0	0	0	—		7	1
Darlington
Darlington	2001–02	Third Division	30	1	3	0	1	0	2 (Note: Appearances in EFL Trophy)	0	36	1
Darlington	2002–03	Third Division	28	1	0	0	1	0	—		29	1
Darlington	2003–04	Third Division	32	1	1	0	1	0	1	0	35	1
Darlington	2004–05	League Two	24	1	2	0	1	0	1	0	28	1
Darlington	2005–06	League Two	1	0	0	0	0	0	—		1	0
Darlington	Total		115	4	6	0	4	0	4	0	129	4
Career total			350	28	23	0	25	0	5	0	403	28

== Honours ==
Middlesbrough

- Football League Cup runner-up: 1997–98
