= Neil Ruddock =

English footballer (born 1968)

Personal information
- Date of birth: 9 May 1968 (age 58)
- Place of birth: Wandsworth, England
- Height: 6 ft 2 in (1.88 m)
- Position: Centre back

Team information
- Current team: Enfield (director)

Youth career
- 1984–1986: Millwall

Senior career*
Years	Team	Apps	(Gls)
1985–1986	Millwall	0	(0)
1986–1988	Tottenham Hotspur	9	(0)
1988–1989	Millwall	2	(1)
1989–1992	Southampton	107	(9)
1992–1993	Tottenham Hotspur	38	(3)
1993–1998	Liverpool	115	(11)
1998	→ Queens Park Rangers (loan)	7	(0)
1998–2000	West Ham United	42	(2)
2000–2001	Crystal Palace	20	(2)
2001–2003	Swindon Town	15	(1)
2015	Wellingborough Whitworth	0	(0)
Total		355	(29)

International career
1986	England Youth	6	(1)
1989	England U21	4	(0)
1994	England B	1	(0)
1994	England	1	(0)
- * Club domestic league appearances and goals

Neil "Razor" Ruddock (born 9 May 1968) is an English former professional footballer and television personality who is a club director at Enfield F.C.

As a player he was a central defender from 1986 to 2003, and was voted the 17th "hardest footballer of all time". He made his debut at Millwall, having been associated with the club since the age of 13, and also represented Tottenham Hotspur, Southampton, Liverpool, West Ham United, Crystal Palace, Queens Park Rangers and Swindon Town during a professional career spanning 17 years. He was capped once by England, in 1994.

Ruddock came out of retirement in 2015, aged 46, to play for United Counties League side Wellingborough Whitworth. He has since appeared on a variety of television shows including I'm a Celebrity... Get Me Out of Here!, Can't Pay? We'll Take It Away! and Celebrity MasterChef.

== Club career ==
=== Early career ===
Ruddock began his career at Millwall, before signing for Tottenham Hotspur in 1986. He broke his leg on his Tottenham debut against Liverpool and made only 11 appearances for Spurs, his only goal coming in a 2–1 defeat to third tier Port Vale in the 1987–88 FA Cup. In the summer of 1988 Ruddock rejoined Millwall.

=== Southampton ===
Ruddock joined Southampton in February 1989, in a £200,000 transfer from Millwall. A rugged, uncompromising defender, he soon became popular with the Southampton fans especially after confidently scoring a penalty against Newcastle United on 1 April in only his sixth game for the club, thus helping the "Saints" earn their first victory in 18 matches and start Southampton on a climb away from the relegation zone. His goal celebration after the 89th-minute penalty became known as the "Ruddock stomp". Ruddock missed his next two penalties, allowing Matt Le Tissier to take over for the following season.

Despite early disciplinary problems at The Dell, Ruddock's talents as a confident, left-footed defender earned him England Under-21 honours. Powerful in the air, he could tackle strongly but was also able to bring the ball forward out of defence.

In the 1991–92 season, Ruddock was a member of the Southampton side that reached the final of the Zenith Data Systems Cup, where they were beaten in extra time 3–2 by Nottingham Forest.

After three years on the south coast, he was enticed back to Tottenham by Terry Venables in May 1992, with the tribunal setting the transfer fee at a "ridiculous" £750,000.

=== Liverpool ===
In July 1993, Ruddock was signed by Liverpool from Tottenham Hotspur on a £2.5 million transfer. While at Liverpool, he was involved in an on-field scuffle with Manchester United player Eric Cantona. Ruddock responded to Cantona's taunts about his weight by turning down the Frenchman's collar. In 1993, he was absolved of fracturing Peter Beardsley's jaw with an elbow in a testimonial match. Beardsley contemplated legal action on the grounds that Ruddock acted deliberately, but later decided to withdraw charges. In 1996, Ruddock's tackle on Andy Cole of Manchester United in a reserve game at Anfield left the player with two broken legs, and Ruddock claimed innocence, while Cole said he believed Ruddock did not intend harm. However, in a 2010 interview with Talksport, he jokingly refers to the incident as "not big, and not clever", adding "but it was great", and that "I didn't mean to break both of his legs if I'm honest, I only meant to break one".

At Liverpool, Ruddock was part of the squad of the 1990s under Roy Evans, known as the "Spice Boys", that included David James, Robbie Fowler, Jamie Redknapp, Jason McAteer, Steve McManaman and Stan Collymore, but left in 1998 when new coach Gérard Houllier joined.

=== Queens Park Rangers ===
In March 1998, Ruddock joined Queens Park Rangers on loan until the end of the season. He made seven appearances of which six were drawn, enabling QPR to avoid relegation at Manchester City's expense.

=== West Ham United ===
In July 1998, Ruddock moved to West Ham United for a fee of £300,000 making his debut on 15 August 1998 in a 1–0 away win against Sheffield Wednesday. In October 1999 whilst playing for West Ham, Ruddock was also involved in a bust-up with Arsenal's Patrick Vieira, with Vieira receiving a six-match ban and a £30,000 fine after spitting at Ruddock after some verbal sparring between the two.

In 56 games for West Ham, he scored three goals, was booked 14 times and sent-off once, in December 1998, in a 4–0 away defeat to Leeds United, for a dangerous tackle on Harry Kewell. The Hammers finished fifth in the Premier League that season – their highest finish for 13 years – and qualified for the UEFA Cup to end a 19-year absence from European competitions.

=== Swindon Town ===
In 2000, Ruddock moved to Crystal Palace on a free transfer, spending one season there before signing for Division Two side Swindon Town. He was also accused by Crystal Palace chairman, Simon Jordan in November 2005, of "taking the team out and getting them wasted when we were fighting relegation". He scored twice for Swindon, with goals against Colchester in the league and Hartlepool in the FA Cup. Relations turned sour when Ruddock refused to quit after being advised to do so by a specialist; during a period of time where the club was in serious financial difficulties. The club responded by appointing Steve Coppell as assistant manager and taking Ruddock's coaching duties away. The board eventually stopped paying Ruddock's wages in an attempt to drive him out. He took the club to an employment tribunal and in December 2002, received £57,000, representing money lost in wages and loyalty payments, with an agreement to terminate his contract as player/coach.

=== Wellingborough Whitworth ===
In January 2015, Ruddock came out of retirement at the age of 46 years, to sign for United Counties League side Wellingborough Whitworth.

== Coaching career ==
In August 2018, Ruddock joined the coaching team of Essex Senior League side Enfield. In June 2020 he became a club director.

== International career ==
Ruddock won four caps for the England Under-21 squad and one in 1994 for England B when he captained the team against Ireland B at Anfield. On 16 November 1994, he won his only senior cap for England, playing in a friendly against Nigeria when Terry Venables was the national team's coach.

== Television career ==
In 2004, he appeared on the third series of I'm a Celebrity... Get Me Out of Here!. After his appearance, he recorded a charity single, a version of "Jungle Rock", with fellow contestants Lord Brocket, Peter Andre and Mike Read, performing as the Jungle Boys.

In 2006, he was involved in the television programme Razor Ruddock's Pass & Move Soccer School where children released by academies were coached by Ruddock.

In 2007, he appeared in Celebrity Wife Swap UK (Series 10 Episode 1), going to live with English singer and television personality Pete Burns, while wife Leah went to live with Burns' partner Michael Simpson.

In 2006, Ruddock helped produce Football Saved My Life a reality sports TV show for Bravo which attempted to change the lives of 15 dysfunctional men through their involvement with football.

In November 2011, he appeared in James May's Man Lab on BBC Two, coaching James May on how to score a penalty kick in front of 20,000 Germans at Veltins-Arena, Gelsenkirchen. James May missed the penalty. He appeared again in April 2013 as a member of the Manlab team representing China at the Rock, Paper, Scissors world championships. In 2019 Ruddock appeared on BBC's Celebrity Masterchef Series 14 where he reached the final three.

In 2019 and 2020, Ruddock featured in both seasons of ITV show Harry's Heroes, which featured former football manager Harry Redknapp attempting to get a squad of former England international footballers back fit and healthy for a game against Germany legends.

== Personal life ==
Ruddock has said he earned the nickname “Razor” after teammates claimed to have seen boxer Donovan Ruddock billed as “Razor Ruddock” during a bout at White Hart Lane in 1987. However, Donovan Ruddock never fought there, although he did appear at Alexandra Palace in 1986.

In 2011, Ruddock was declared bankrupt. He later appeared on the Channel 5 programme Can't Pay? We'll Take It Away! in September 2014, when High Court enforcement agents attempted to recover an alleged unpaid £3,000 bill owed to a dog kennel.

In 2020, Ruddock confirmed that he had been fitted with a pacemaker.

== Career statistics ==
=== Club ===
Appearances and goals by club, season and competition
Club	Season	League			FA Cup		League Cup		Other		Total	
Club	Season	Division	Apps	Goals	Apps	Goals	Apps	Goals	Apps	Goals	Apps	Goals
Millwall	1984–85	Third Division	0	0	0	0	0	0	4 (Note: Appearances in Football League Trophy)	1	4	1
Millwall	1985–86	Second Division	0	0	0	0	0	0	0	0	0	0
Millwall	Total		0	0	0	0	0	0	4	1	4	1
Tottenham Hotspur	1986–87	First Division	4	0	1	0	0	0	—		5	0
Tottenham Hotspur	1987–88	First Division	5	0	1	1	0	0	—		6	1
Tottenham Hotspur	Total		9	0	2	1	0	0	—		11	1
Millwall	1988–89	First Division	2	1	0	0	2	3	2 (Note: Appearances in Full Members' Cup)	0	6	4
Southampton	1988–89	First Division	13	3	—		—		—		13	3
Southampton	1989–90	First Division	29	3	1	1	6	0	—		36	4
Southampton	1990–91	First Division	35	3	3	1	4	1	2	0	44	5
Southampton	1991–92	First Division	30	0	6	1	5	0	4	0	45	1
Southampton	Total		107	9	10	3	15	1	6	0	138	13
Tottenham Hotspur	1992–93	Premier League	38	3	5	0	4	0	—		47	3
Liverpool	1993–94	Premier League	39	3	2	0	5	1	—		46	4
Liverpool	1994–95	Premier League	37	2	7	0	8	0	—		52	2
Liverpool	1995–96	Premier League	20	5	2	0	4	0	2 (Note: Appearance(s) in UEFA Cup)	0	28	5
Liverpool	1996–97	Premier League	17	1	0	0	2	0	3 (Note: Appearances in UEFA Cup Winners' Cup)	0	22	1
Liverpool	1997–98	Premier League	2	0	0	0	1	0	1	0	4	0
Liverpool	Total		115	11	11	0	20	1	6	0	152	12
Queens Park Rangers (loan)	1997–98	First Division	7	0	—		—		—		7	0
West Ham United	1998–99	Premier League	27	2	2	0	1	0	—		30	2
West Ham United	1999–2000	Premier League	15	0	1	0	4	0	6 (Note: Three appearances and one goal in UEFA Cup, three in UEFA Intertoto Cup)	1	26	1
West Ham United	Total		42	2	3	0	5	0	6	1	56	3
Crystal Palace	2000–01	First Division	20	2	1	0	5	1	—		26	3
Swindon Town	2001–02	Second Division	15	1	2	1	1	0	1	0	19	2
Career total			355	29	34	5	52	6	25	2	466	42

== Honours ==
Southampton

- Full Members Cup runner-up: 1991–92

Liverpool

- Football League Cup: 1994–95

West Ham United

- UEFA Intertoto Cup: 1998–99
