= Lee Powell (footballer) =

Welsh footballer

Personal information
- Full name: Lee Powell
- Date of birth: 2 June 1973 (age 53)
- Place of birth: Caerleon, Wales
- Position: Forward

Senior career*
Years	Team	Apps	(Gls)
1991–1993	Southampton	7	(0)
1993–1994	Hamilton Academical	5	(0)
- Yeovil Town
Total		12	(0)

International career
- Wales under-21
- * Club domestic league appearances and goals

Lee Powell (born 2 June 1973) is a Welsh former football forward, who played for Southampton.

== Career statistics ==
Appearances and goals by club, season and competition
Club	Season	League			FA Cup		League Cup		Other		Total	
Club	Season	Division	Apps	Goals	Apps	Goals	Apps	Goals	Apps	Goals	Apps	Goals
Southampton
Southampton	1990–91	First Division	0	0	0	0	1	0	1 (Note: Appearances in Full Members' Cup)	0	2	0
Southampton	1991–92	First Division	4	0	0	0	0	0	—		4	0
Southampton	1992–93	Premier League	2	0	0	0	0	0	—		2	0
Southampton	1993–94	Premier League	1	0	0	0	0	0	—		1	0
Southampton	Total		7	0	0	0	1	0	1	0	9	0
Hamilton Academical	1993–94	Scottish First Division	5	0	0	0	0	0	—		5	0
Career total			12	0	0	0	1	0	1	0	14	0
