= Brian Law =

Welsh footballer

Personal information
- Full name: Brian John Law
- Date of birth: 1 January 1970 (age 56)
- Place of birth: Merthyr Tydfil, Wales
- Height: 6 ft 2 in (1.88 m)
- Position: Defender

Senior career*
Years	Team	Apps	(Gls)
1987–1991	Queens Park Rangers	20	(0)
1994–1997	Wolverhampton Wanderers	31	(1)
1997–1999	Millwall	45	(4)

International career
1990	Wales	1	(0)
- * Club domestic league appearances and goals

Brian John Law (born 1 January 1970) is a Welsh former professional footballer and Wales international.

== Club career ==
Law began his career with Queens Park Rangers making his debut against Sheffield Wednesday at Loftus Road in the final game of the 1987 season, making a total of 20 appearances for the side before being forced into retirement in 1991 due to a tendon injury. Law spent three years outside of football on a backpacking trip around the world, before returning in 1994 after discovering his injury was able to withstand the rigours of professional football. He joined Wolverhampton Wanderers, who were required to pay £34,000 to Law's insurance company for the compensation he had received on retirement and £100,000 to his former club, Queens Park Rangers. During his time with the Wolves, Law was arrested after driving a bus while drunk, later receiving a fine and community service.

After initially beginning to establish himself in the first team, Law was forced to undergo ankle reconstruction surgery and never managed to regain his place in the side, eventually moving to Millwall in 1997. He made 47 appearances as club captain in all competitions during his first season at The New Den and remained a regular in the first team at the start of the following season before a knee injury forced him out of the side after less than one month of the 1998–99 season. He was later released by Millwall in 2000, never playing professional football again.

== International career ==
Law played for Wales U15 schoolboys, represented and captained the youth team at U16, U18, and U21s, as well as the B team against England at Tranmere (5/12/90). Despite having only played a handful of games for Queens Park Rangers, Law was called up to the Wales senior squad in September 1988 (Holland) when, Rangers coach and Wales assistant manager, Peter Shreeves recommended him to Wales manager Terry Yorath after an injury crisis had resulted in a large number of withdrawals from the squad. He was an unused substitute against Holland, Italy, and Malta; however, he was handed his debut on 25 April 1990 in a 4-2 defeat to Sweden. Law was recalled to the squad, after his 2-year retirement from the game, for the 3-1 defeat away to Bulgaria (29/3/95).

== After football ==
Following his retirement, Law earned a degree in sports science after undertaking a three-year course at Roehampton University. He later set up his own charities named Fit for Life and Sozo in 2003, designed to give teenagers in Birmingham access to sports such as football, hockey and streetball as well as set up musical workshops, resulting in Urban Chart success, reaching Number 7 with 'Detention' Artist : C4 ft Romo. In 2025 he was reported by The Times to be among the thousands of landlords and tenants affected by rules introduced after the Grenfell Tower fire.
