= Andy Cook (footballer, born 1969) =

English footballer (born 1969)

Personal information
- Full name: Andrew Charles Cook
- Date of birth: 10 August 1969 (age 57)
- Place of birth: Romsey, England
- Height: 5 ft 10 in (1.78 m)
- Position: Left-back

Team information
- Current team: Eastleigh (physio)

Youth career
- 1985–1987: Southampton

Senior career*
Years	Team	Apps	(Gls)
1987–1991	Southampton	16	(1)
1991–1993	Exeter City	70	(1)
1993–1997	Swansea City	62	(0)
1997	→ Portsmouth (loan)	5	(0)
1997–1998	Portsmouth	4	(0)
1998–1999	Millwall	5	(0)
1999–2006	Salisbury City		
2008	Woking	0	(0)
- * Club domestic league appearances and goals

Andrew Charles Cook (born 10 August 1969) is an English former professional footballer who played as a left-back and who is now the physiotherapist at National League side Eastleigh.

== Playing career ==
After playing for Halterworth and Mountbatten school teams, Cook gained representative honours for Eastleigh and Winchester Schools, and Hampshire Schools, before signing as a trainee at Southampton in 1985. He signed full professional terms in July 1987, and made his full first-team debut at home to Manchester United on 15 August that year.

Having only played 22 first-team games in all competitions, and scoring one goal, and failing to settle into a regular first-team slot at either left-back or left-midfield, Cook signed for Exeter City (then managed by former Southampton player Alan Ball) in September 1991 for a fee of about £50,000.

Cook's nomadic career has subsequently taken him to Swansea City, Portsmouth, Millwall, and, lastly, Salisbury City.

== Career as physiotherapist ==
He retired at the end of the 2005–06 season, becoming Salisbury's Football in the Community Officer. He then became manager of the club's reserve team before becoming part of City's physio staff.

In Summer 2008, he left Salisbury to become Woking's physio and also registering as a player. Following the departure of Kim Grant as manager, he was briefly joint caretaker boss of Woking with Phil Gilchrist.

In 2009, Cook joined Conference South side Eastleigh as a physio.

== Career statistics ==
Appearances and goals by club, season and competition
Club	Season	League			FA Cup		League Cup		Other		Total	
Club	Season	Division	Apps	Goals	Apps	Goals	Apps	Goals	Apps	Goals	Apps	Goals
Southampton
Southampton	1987–88	First Division	2	0	0	0	0	0	—		2	0
Southampton	1988–89	First Division	3	0	0	0	2	0	—		5	0
Southampton	1989–90	First Division	4	1	0	0	0	0	—		4	1
Southampton	1990–91	First Division	7	0	1	0	2	0	1 (Note: Appearances in Full Members' Cup)	0	11	0
Southampton	Total		16	1	1	0	4	0	1	0	22	1
Exeter City	1991–92	Third Division	38	0	5	0	0	0	—		43	0
Exeter City	1992–93	Second Division	32	1	2	1	2	0	6 (Note: Appearances in EFL Trophy)	1	42	3
Exeter City	Total		70	1	7	1	2	0	6	1	85	3
Swansea City
Swansea City	1993-94	Second Division	28	0	0	0	0	0	0	0	28	0
Swansea City	1994-95	Second Division	1	0	0	0	0	0	0	0	1	0
Swansea City	1995-96	Second Division	33	0	0	0	0	0	0	0	33	0
Swansea City	Total		62	0	0	0	0	0	0	0	0	0
Portsmouth (loan)	1996–97	First Division	5	0	0	0	0	0	—		5	0
Portsmouth
Portsmouth	1996–97	First Division	3	0	0	0	0	0	—		3	0
Portsmouth	1997–98	First Division	1	0	0	0	0	0	—		1	0
Portsmouth	Total		9	0	0	0	0	0	0	0	9	0
Millwall
Millwall	1997–98	Second Division	3	0	0	0	0	0	—		3	0
Millwall	1998–99	Second Division	2	0	0	0	0	0	—		2	0
Millwall	Total		5	0	0	0	0	0	0	0	5	0
Career total			162	2	8	1	6	0	7	1	183	4
