= Neal Bartlett =

English footballer

Personal information
- Full name: Neal James Bartlett
- Date of birth: 7 April 1975 (age 51)
- Place of birth: Southampton, England
- Height: 5 ft 8 in (1.73 m)
- Position: Midfielder

Youth career
- 1990–1993: Southampton

Senior career*
Years	Team	Apps	(Gls)
1993–1994	Southampton	15	(0)
1994–1995	Fareham Town		
1995	BK Häcken		
1995–1996	Bashley	16	(2)
1996–1997	Hereford United	3	(0)
1997	Newport County	12	(0)
1997	Salisbury City		
1998	Hastings Town		
1998	Lymington Town		
1998	New Milton Town		
1999–2001	Tring Town		
2001–2002	Bath City	4	(1)
2001–2002	Tring Town		
20??–2006	Shildon		
2006–2007	Ballyclare Comrades		
2007–2008	Institute		
- * Club domestic league appearances and goals

Neal James Bartlett (born 7 April 1975) is an English retired football midfielder who played professionally for Southampton and Hereford United.

== Football career ==
=== Southampton ===
Bartlett was born in Southampton and after playing for the city schools, he joined Southampton F.C. as a trainee. He signed as an associate schoolboy in June 1990, and his first professional contract in July 1993. He made his first team debut on 1 May 1993, in the penultimate match of the 1992–93 season, as a substitute in a 1–0 home defeat to Manchester City.

He made a handful of appearances at the start of the following season, making his first start on 25 August 1993 when his cross in the 11th minute was volleyed home by Matthew Le Tissier for the opening goal in a 5–1 victory over Swindon Town. After the arrival of Paul Allen in September, Bartlett was restricted to the occasional substitute appearance. Following the replacement of Bartlett's mentor, Ian Branfoot by Alan Ball in January 1994, Bartlett fell right out of the reckoning and he was released in December 1994.

=== Minor league football ===
After being released by Southampton in 1994, he joined Fareham Town for the rest of the season. He then spent the summer of 1995 with Swedish side BK Häcken before signing for New Forest club Bashley in November 1995. After an unsuccessful trial with Swansea City in August 1996, he returned to professional football when he joined Hereford United in September 1996.

=== Hereford United ===
He made his Hereford debut on 21 September 1996, as a late substitute for Gareth Stoker, in Hereford's 3–0 win at home to Rochdale. He made two further appearances, both as substitute, before being released.

=== Later career ===
He left Hereford in March 1997, moving to Newport County where he remained until the end of the season. His next club was Salisbury City, who he joined in December 1997, only staying for a few weeks. He then played for a succession of minor clubs, including Hastings Town, Lymington Town and New Milton Town before joining Tring Town in 1999.

By now, Bartlett had abandoned plans for a full-time career in football and in March 1999 he enlisted in the Army, joining the Princess of Wales's Royal Regiment. He continued to play club football alongside his military career, remaining with Tring Town until joining Bath City in August 2001. He scored, albeit by punching the ball into the net, on his debut against Cambridge City, but as a serving soldier found it difficult to juggle his playing and army responsibilities, and played only three further games. He was released by Bath and returned to Tring Town.

In the summer of 2002, after playing for the Combined Services, he was approached by Port Vale but declined to resurrect his professional football career, deciding to remain a full-time soldier.

Whilst based at Catterick Garrison, Bartlett spent a year and a half as assistant manager and central midfielder for Shildon leaving them in October 2006 to join Ballyclare Comrades, moving from there to Institute in January 2007.
