= 1995–96 Southampton F.C. season =

Southampton F.C.
1995–96 season
- Chairman: Guy Askham
- Manager: Alan Ball (until 2 July 1995); Dave Merrington (from 14 July 1995)
- Stadium: The Dell
- FA Premier League: 17th
- FA Cup: Sixth round
- League Cup: Fourth round
- Top goalscorer: League: Matt Le Tissier (7); Neil Shipperley (7); All: Neil Shipperley (12)
- Highest home attendance: 15,262 v Manchester; United (13 April 1996)
- Lowest home attendance: 11,059 v West Ham; United (25 October 1995)
- Average home league attendance: 14,822
- Biggest win: 3–0 v Cardiff City (19 September 1995); 3–0 v Portsmouth (7 January 1996)
- Biggest defeat: 0–3 v Chelsea (16 September 1995); 1–4 v Manchester; United (18 November 1995); 0–3 v Queens Park; Rangers (30 March 1996); 0–3 v Aston Villa (8 April 1996)
Home colours	Away colours	Third colours

The 1995–96 Southampton F.C. season was the club's 95th season of competitive football, their 26th in the top flight of English football, and their fourth in the FA Premier League. It was the sole season to feature Dave Merrington as the club's manager, who took over from Alan Ball in the summer of 1995. After finishing 10th in 1994–95, their highest league position in five years, the Saints had a disappointing season as they finished 17th in the FA Premier League, avoiding relegation on goal difference only (with Ball's Manchester City side going down in their place). Outside the league, the club reached the sixth round of the FA Cup and the fourth round of the League Cup – the first time they had reached either stage since the 1991–92 season.

Southampton had a quiet transfer period ahead of the 1995–96 campaign, with Newcastle United full-back Alan Neilson their only first-team signing of the summer. Later in the season, Merrington signed right-back Barry Venison, goalkeeper Neil Moss and winger Mark Walters, as well as selling midfielder Paul Allen, centre-back Peter Whiston, winger Paul McDonald and striker Craig Maskell for small fees. The side played poorly throughout the season, picking up just nine wins in the league – their lowest tally in over 25 years – and scoring just 34 goals, the lowest in their 101-year league history. Southampton ultimately avoided relegation only on the basis of goal difference, with Manchester City's final day loss against Liverpool determining their relegation.

Outside the league, Southampton reached the sixth round of the FA Cup by defeating three sides in lower divisions: they beat local rivals Portsmouth of the First Division, made it past Second Division side Crewe Alexandra after a replay, and eliminated Swindon Town of the same division in the same manner. In their final game of the tournament, the Saints were eliminated by Manchester United, who went on to win the FA Premier League and FA Cup double. In the League Cup, Southampton beat Second Division strugglers Cardiff City and league rivals West Ham United, before facing elimination at the hands of First Division club Reading. This marked Southampton's best performance in both cups since 1991–92, when they reached the same stages.

Southampton used 25 players during the 1995–96 season and had 14 different goalscorers. In a low-scoring season, striker Neil Shipperley finished as the club's top goalscorer with just 12 goals in all competitions, including a joint-high (with Matt Le Tissier) seven in the league. Shipperley also made the most appearances for the club during the campaign, featuring in all but one league game across all competitions. Goalkeeper Dave Beasant won the Southampton F.C. Player of the Season award for 1995–96. The average league attendance at The Dell in 1995–96 was 14,822 – a slight increase on the previous season. The highest attendance was 15,262 against Manchester United in April; the lowest was 11,059 against West Ham United in October.

== Background and transfers ==
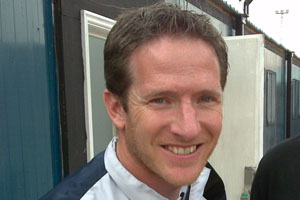
Outgoing manager Alan Ball signed full-back Alan Neilson from Newcastle United in the summer of 1995 for £500,000.

Barry Venison was Dave Merrington's first signing for Southampton, bought from Galatasaray for £850,000 in October 1995.

Prior to leaving the club, manager Alan Ball made one signing for Southampton during the summer 1995 transfer window, bringing in full-back Alan Neilson from Newcastle United for £500,000. Ball's replacement Dave Merrington did not sign anyone else until October, when he paid £850,000 for right-back Barry Venison from Turkish club Galatasaray. The same month, midfielder Paul Allen was released on a free transfer to Second Division side Swindon Town and centre-back Peter Whiston – signed by Ball just over a year earlier – was sold to Shrewsbury Town (also of the third flight) for £50,000. The last transfer of the calendar year saw 20-year-old goalkeeper Neil Moss arrive from local Second Division club Bournemouth just before Christmas – the Saints paid £200,000 for the player, which rose to £250,000 based on appearances.

In the new year, Southampton signed winger Mark Walters from Liverpool on a free transfer. In February, Scottish winger Paul McDonald – who had spent most of the season on loan at Burnley – was sold to another Second Division side, Brighton & Hove Albion (who were then managed by former Saints midfielder Jimmy Case), for a fee of £40,000 rising to £75,000 based on appearances. Craig Maskell also moved to Case's Seagulls for £40,000 a few weeks later, following a two-month loan spell at Bristol City. Later in March a third player, Scottish defender Derek Allan, moved to Brighton on loan for the rest of the season – he would join permanently at the beginning of the next season.

Players transferred in

Name	Nationality	Pos.	Club	Date	Fee	Ref.
Alan Neilson	Wales	DF	(England) Newcastle United	1 June 1995	£500,000	
Phil Warner	England	DF	none (free agent)	July 1995	Free (Note: Phil Warner initially joined as a trainee in July 1995, before turning professional in August 1997.)	
Barry Venison	England	DF	(Turkey) Galatasaray	25 October 1995	£850,000	
Neil Moss	England	GK	(England) Bournemouth	20 December 1995	£200,000+ (Note: Southampton initially paid £200,000 for Neil Moss, which rose to £250,000 based on appearances.)	
Mark Walters	England	MF	(England) Liverpool	18 January 1996	Free	

Players transferred out

Name	Nationality	Pos.	Club	Date	Fee	Ref.
Paul Allen	England	MF	(England) Swindon Town	11 October 1995	Free	
Peter Whiston	England	DF	(England) Shrewsbury Town	20 October 1995	£50,000	
Paul McDonald	Scotland	MF	(England) Brighton & Hove Albion	16 February 1996	£40,000+ (Note: Paul McDonald was initially sold for £40,000, which rose to £75,000 based on appearances.)	
Craig Maskell	England	FW	(England) Brighton & Hove Albion	1 March 1996	£40,000	

Players loaned out

Name	Nationality	Pos.	Club	Date from	Date to	Ref.
Paul McDonald	Scotland	MF	(England) Burnley	15 September 1995	16 February 1996	
Craig Maskell	England	FW	(England) Bristol City	28 December 1995	1 March 1996	
Derek Allan	Scotland	DF	(England) Brighton & Hove Albion	28 March 1996	End of season	

== Pre-season friendlies ==
Ahead of the 1995–96 campaign, Southampton played nine pre-season friendlies. In July, they embarked on a short tour of Ireland which included three games against local opposition – a 1–2 defeat at St Patrick's Athletic (who went on to become champions of the Irish Premier Division), a 4–2 win over Irish First Division side Waterford United, and a 0–1 loss at Cork City. Back in England, they lost 1–2 at Second Division side Wycombe Wanderers and 0–3 at First Division side Millwall, before travelling over to the Netherlands where they drew 1–1 with Sparta Rotterdam and 2–2 with Volendam, both of the Eredivisie. Whilst in the Netherlands, the Saints concluded their pre-season preparations by taking part in the Paling Cup, a friendly tournament consisting of 45-minute games – they drew 0–0 with IJsselmeervogels before beating Spakenburg 3–1.

24 July 1995 Friendly	St Patrick's Athletic	2–1	Southampton	Dublin, Ireland
			Widdrington	Stadium: Richmond Park

26 July 1995 Friendly	Waterford United	2–4	Southampton	Waterford, Ireland
			Le Tissier Maddison; Watson	Stadium: Waterford RSC

28 July 1995 Friendly	Cork City	1–0	Southampton	Cork, Ireland
				Stadium: Turners Cross

1 August 1995 Friendly	Wycombe Wanderers	2–1	Southampton	High Wycombe
			Le Tissier	Stadium: Adams Park

4 August 1995 Friendly	Millwall	3–0	Southampton	London
				Stadium: The Den

8 August 1995 Friendly	Sparta Rotterdam	1–1	Southampton	Rotterdam, Netherlands
				Stadium: Sparta Stadion

9 August 1995 Friendly	Volendam	2–2	Southampton	Volendam, Netherlands
			Le Tissier	Stadium: Kras Stadion

11 August 1995 Paling Cup	IJsselmeervogels	0–0	Southampton	Netherlands

11 August 1995 Paling Cup	Spakenburg	1–3	Southampton	Netherlands
			Hughes; Le Tissier

== FA Premier League ==
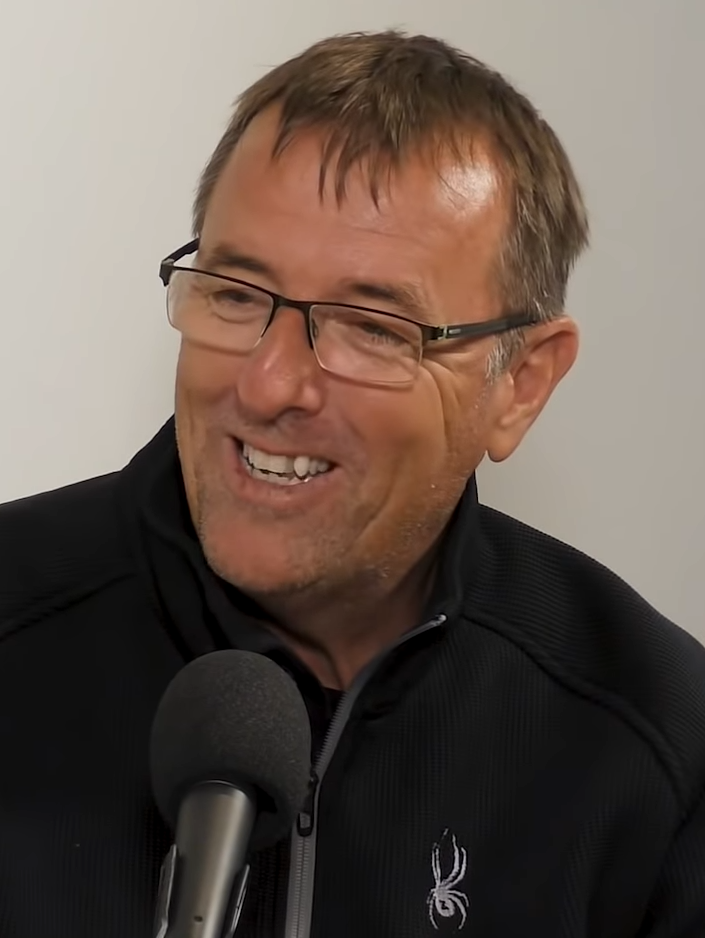
Matt Le Tissier finished as Southampton's joint-top scorer in the league alongside Neil Shipperley, on seven goals each.

Southampton opened their 1995–96 FA Premier League season at home to Nottingham Forest, who had finished third in the league the previous year. The end-to-end game finished 4–3 in favour of the visitors, with all three goals for the hosts scored by Matt Le Tissier – two from penalties given for fouls against him, one in the last ten minutes from a free kick. After a 0–2 loss at Everton the next week, the Saints picked up their first points of the season in two home games against last season's fifth and sixth place finishers, drawing 1–1 with Leeds United and beating Newcastle United 1–0 thanks to a second-half goal from Jim Magilton. They subsequently dropped into the relegation zone for the first time after three poor away results in a row: a goalless draw at recently-promoted Middlesbrough, a 0–3 defeat at Chelsea and a 2–4 loss at Arsenal. They stayed there into October with another goalless draw, this time at home to West Ham United, followed by another two defeats: 1–2 at reigning league champions Blackburn Rovers and 1–3 at home to fellow title challengers Liverpool. During the latter game, Le Tissier received the second of two career red cards when he was dismissed for "ungentlemanly conduct", following fouls on Ian Rush and Phil Babb.

After spending a few weeks in the bottom three of the table, the Saints picked up two crucial victories when they beat Wimbledon 2–1 (thanks to a Neil Shipperley double) and Queens Park Rangers 2–0, with both games featuring dismissals for the opposition. The improvement in form was short-lived, however, as two more defeats against top-tier opponents followed – first, the South Coast side lost 1–4 at Manchester United, who went 3–0 up within the first nine minutes; and two days later, they lost 0–1 at home to Aston Villa. A 1–0 win over fellow strugglers Bolton Wanderers and two more draws against Liverpool and ten-man Arsenal ensured the team stayed clear of the relegation places.

Southampton did not win again until 20 January 1996, when they overturned a 0–1 deficit to beat Middlesbrough 2–1 at The Dell. After another pair of draws against Manchester City and Everton, though, the Saints faced four consecutive defeats which saw them drop back into the bottom three. The run included a marginal 2–3 defeat at home to Chelsea in which they "dominate[d] large chunks of the game", followed by a 0–1 loss at Tottenham Hotspur, a 1–2 defeat at Manchester City in which they saw a goal disallowed in injury time, and a 0–1 loss hosting Sheffield Wednesday, who scored the only goal of the game within the first minute. They moved up to 17th in the table with a 1–0 win over Coventry City, before losing again at Queens Park Rangers, who were also fighting against the threat of relegation, and mid-table side Leeds United.

The beginning of April saw Southampton pick up an unlikely 1–0 win over defending league champions Blackburn Rovers, thanks to an 80th-minute Le Tissier penalty. Another loss against Aston Villa was followed by another upset as the Saints beat league leaders (and eventual champions) Manchester United 3–1 at home, scoring all three of their goals in the first half (including Le Tissier's first in open play since the beginning of the season). This game became infamous after United changed from their regular grey away strip to their blue-and-white third kit at half time, claiming that the players were struggling to see one another on the field. Two weeks later, Southampton beat Bolton Wanderers 1–0 at Burnden Park to confirm the hosts' relegation, before confirming their own safety a week later with a goalless draw against Wimbledon – Manchester City, managed by previous Saints boss Alan Ball – went down in 18th place on goal difference behind Southampton and Coventry City, after failing to secure a win against final opponents Liverpool.

=== List of match results ===
19 August 1995 1	Southampton	3–4	Nottingham Forest	Southampton
16:00 BST	Le Tissier 10' (pen.), 69' (pen.), 81', (yellow card) 86'; Heaney (yellow card) 16'	Report	Cooper 8'; Campbell (yellow card) 15'; Woan 36', (yellow card) 86'; Roy 42', 79'; Bohinen (yellow card) 80'	Stadium: The Dell; Attendance: 15,164; Referee: Gary Willard

26 August 1995 2	Everton	2–0	Southampton	Liverpool
15:00 BST	Limpar 35'; Amokachi 43'	Report	Hall (yellow card) 72'; Le Tissier (yellow card) 76'	Stadium: Goodison Park; Attendance: 33,668; Referee: Jeff Winter

30 August 1995 3	Southampton	1–1	Leeds United	Southampton
19:30 BST	Widdrington 82'	Report	Dorigo (yellow card) 43', (goal) 71'; Pemberton (yellow card) 82'	Stadium: The Dell; Attendance: 15,212; Referee: Keith Cooper

9 September 1995 4	Southampton	1–0	Newcastle United	Southampton
15:00 BST	Neilson (yellow card) 30'; Hall (yellow card) 32'; Magilton 64'; Benali (yellow card) 76'	Report	Gillespie (yellow card) 62'	Stadium: The Dell; Attendance: 15,237; Referee: Gerald Ashby

12 September 1995 5	Middlesbrough	0–0	Southampton	Middlesbrough
19:45 BST	Pearson (yellow card) 42'; Mustoe (yellow card) 76'	Report	Benali (yellow card) 51'	Stadium: Riverside Stadium; Attendance: 29,181; Referee: Peter Jones

16 September 1995 6	Chelsea	3–0	Southampton	London
15:00 BST	Sinclair 74'; Gullit 89'; Hughes 90'	Report	Neilson (yellow card) 64'; Dodd (yellow card); Le Tissier (yellow card); Maddison (yellow card); Magilton (yellow card)	Stadium: Stamford Bridge; Attendance: 26,237; Referee: Paul Alcock

23 September 1995 7	Arsenal	4–2	Southampton	London
15:00 BST	Bergkamp 17', 68'; Adams 23'; Wright 73', (yellow card)	Report	Heaney (yellow card) 11'; Watson 24'; Monkou 45'; Shipperley (yellow card) 77'; Hall (yellow card); Le Tissier (yellow card)	Stadium: Arsenal Stadium; Attendance: 38,136; Referee: Robbie Hart

2 October 1995 8	Southampton	0–0	West Ham United	Southampton
20:00 BST	Widdrington (yellow card) 23'; Benali (yellow card) 71'	Report	Hutchison (yellow card) 44'; Moncur (yellow card) 85'	Stadium: The Dell; Attendance: 13,568; Referee: Graham Poll

14 October 1995 9	Blackburn Rovers	2–1	Southampton	Blackburn
15:00 BST	Bohinen 19'; Shearer 69'	Report	Maddison 90'; Monkou (yellow card)	Stadium: Ewood Park; Attendance: 26,780; Referee: Mike Reed

22 October 1995 10	Southampton	1–3	Liverpool	Southampton
16:00 BST	Watson 2'; Le Tissier (yellow card) 12' (yellow-red card) 68'	Report	McManaman 21', 55'; Babb (yellow card) 66'; Redknapp 73'	Stadium: The Dell; Attendance: 15,245; Referee: Dermot Gallagher

28 October 1995 11	Wimbledon	1–2	Southampton	London
15:00 GMT	Fitzgerald (yellow card) 55' (yellow-red card) 84'; Euell 63'	Report	Shipperley 8', 74'	Stadium: Selhurst Park; Attendance: 7,982; Referee: Jeff Winter

4 November 1995 12	Southampton	2–0	Queens Park Rangers	Southampton
15:00 GMT	Dodd 2'; Le Tissier 76'; Benali (yellow card); Heaney (yellow card)	Report	Bardsley (red card) 76'; Dichio (yellow card)	Stadium: The Dell; Attendance: 15,137; Referee: Roger Dilkes

18 November 1995 13	Manchester United	4–1	Southampton	Manchester
15:00 GMT	Giggs 1', 4'; Scholes 9'; Cole 69'; Butt (yellow card) 70'	Report	Widdrington (yellow card) 2'; Shipperley 86'	Stadium: Old Trafford; Attendance: 39,301; Referee: Paul Danson

20 November 1995 14	Southampton	0–1	Aston Villa	Southampton
20:00 GMT		Report	Johnson (yellow card) 8', (goal) 29'; Milošević (yellow card) 14'	Stadium: The Dell; Attendance: 13,582; Referee: David Elleray

25 November 1995 15	Southampton	1–0	Bolton Wanderers	Southampton
15:00 GMT	Monkou (yellow card) 39'; Hughes 73'	Report	Thompson (yellow card) 12'; Taggart (yellow card) 83'	Stadium: The Dell; Attendance: 14,404; Referee: Peter Jones

2 December 1995 16	Liverpool	1–1	Southampton	Liverpool
15:00 GMT	Collymore 66'; Clough (yellow card) 67'	Report	Monkou (yellow card) 29'; Dodd (yellow card) 35'; Shipperley 60'; Charlton (yellow card) 87'	Stadium: Anfield; Attendance: 38,007; Referee: Robbie Hart

9 December 1995 17	Southampton	0–0	Arsenal	Southampton
15:00 GMT	Le Tissier (yellow card) 41'	Report	Winterburn (yellow card) 2'; Merson (yellow card) 34'; Keown (yellow card) 41'; Bould (yellow card) 46'; Adams (red card) 54'	Stadium: The Dell; Attendance: 15,238; Referee: Paul Danson

16 December 1995 18	West Ham United	2–1	Southampton	London
15:00 GMT	Moncur (yellow card) 44'; Dowie (yellow card) 54', (goal) 83'; Breacker (yellow card) 79'; Cottee 80'	Report	Bishop 23' (o.g.); Venison (yellow card) 29'; Hall (yellow card) 86'	Stadium: Boleyn Ground; Attendance: 18,501; Referee: Alan Wilkie

23 December 1995 19	Sheffield Wednesday	2–2	Southampton	Sheffield
15:00 GMT	Hirst 13' (pen.), 50' (pen.); Nolan (yellow card) 55'	Report	Heaney 6'; Hall (yellow card) 50'; Magilton 79' (pen.); Neilson (yellow card) 88'	Stadium: Hillsborough Stadium; Attendance: 25,115; Referee: Jeff Winter

26 December 1995 20	Southampton	0–0	Tottenham Hotspur	Southampton
12:00 GMT	Charlton (yellow card) 17'; Venison (yellow card) 47'	Report	Edinburgh (yellow card) 55'	Stadium: The Dell; Attendance: 15,238; Referee: Paul Durkin

1 January 1996 21	Coventry City	1–1	Southampton	Coventry
15:00 GMT	Richardson (yellow card) 22'; Busst (yellow card) 51'; Whelan 83'	Report	Heaney 64'	Stadium: Highfield Road; Attendance: 16,818; Referee: Keith Cooper

13 January 1996 22	Nottingham Forest	1–0	Southampton	Nottingham
15:00 GMT	Cooper 44'; Pearce (yellow card) 48'	Report	Dodd (yellow card) 25'; Monkou (yellow card) 50'	Stadium: City Ground; Attendance: 23,321; Referee: Stephen Lodge

20 January 1996 23	Southampton	2–1	Middlesbrough	Southampton
15:00 GMT	Shipperley 64'; Walters (yellow card) 70'; Hall 72'	Report	Barmby 44'; O'Halloran (yellow card) 55'; Whelan (yellow card) 67' (yellow-red card) 71'	Stadium: The Dell; Attendance: 15,151; Referee: Keith Burge

31 January 1996 24	Southampton	1–1	Manchester City	Southampton
19:30 GMT	Le Tissier (yellow card) 30'; Walters (yellow card) 47'; Shipperley 66'	Report	Curle (yellow card) 51'; Frontzeck (yellow card) 75'; Rösler 84'	Stadium: The Dell; Attendance: 15,172; Referee: Steve Dunn

3 February 1996 25	Southampton	2–2	Everton	Southampton
15:00 GMT	Watson 1'; Magilton 77'	Report	Short (yellow card) 36'; Stuart 52'; Horne 56'; Limpar (yellow card) 62'	Stadium: The Dell; Attendance: 15,136; Referee: David Elleray

24 February 1996 26	Southampton	2–3	Chelsea	Southampton
15:00 GMT	Widdrington 6'; Watson (yellow card) 33'; Clarke 38' (o.g.); Magilton (yellow card) 48'; Venison (yellow card) 80'	Report	Wise 20', 26' (pen.), (yellow card) 22'; Hughes (yellow card) 52'; Gullit 53'	Stadium: The Dell; Attendance: 15,226; Referee: Gerald Ashby

2 March 1996 27	Tottenham Hotspur	1–0	Southampton	London
15:00 GMT	Dozzell 63'	Report	Benali (yellow card) 43'; Widdrington (yellow card) 58'	Stadium: White Hart Lane; Attendance: 26,320; Referee: Keith Burge

16 March 1996 28	Manchester City	2–1	Southampton	Manchester
15:00 GMT	Kinkladze 32', 38'; Rösler (yellow card) 33'; Summerbee (yellow card) 77'; Clough (yellow card) 79'; Flitcroft (yellow card) 82'	Report	Hall (yellow card) 33'; Tisdale 65'; Hughes (yellow card) 66'; Charlton (yellow card) 75'; Le Tissier (yellow card) 80'; Watson (red card) 89'	Stadium: Maine Road; Attendance: 29,550; Referee: Jeff Winter

20 March 1996 29	Southampton	0–1	Sheffield Wednesday	Southampton
19:30 GMT		Report	Degryse 1'; Sheridan (yellow card) 63'; Whittingham (yellow card) 74'	Stadium: The Dell; Attendance: 13,216; Referee: Martin Bodenham

25 March 1996 30	Southampton	1–0	Coventry City	Southampton
20:00 GMT	Dodd 2'; Venison (yellow card) 25'; Le Tissier (yellow card) 70'; Monkou (yellow card) 75'	Report	Williams (yellow card) 18'	Stadium: The Dell; Attendance: 14,461; Referee: Stephen Lodge

30 March 1996 31	Queens Park Rangers	3–0	Southampton	London
15:00 GMT	Brevett 24', (yellow card); Dichio 59'; Gallen 77'; Bardsley (yellow card); Holloway (yellow card); Yates (yellow card)	Report	Charlton (yellow card); Dodd (yellow card); Monkou (yellow card)	Stadium: Loftus Road; Attendance: 17,615; Referee: Peter Jones

3 April 1996 32	Leeds United	1–0	Southampton	Leeds
19:45 BST	Deane 72'; Radebe (yellow card) 87'	Report	Venison (yellow card) 86'	Stadium: Elland Road; Attendance: 26,077; Referee: Martin Bodenham

6 April 1996 33	Southampton	1–0	Blackburn Rovers	Southampton
15:00 BST	Le Tissier 80' (pen.)	Report	Gallacher (yellow card) 14'	Stadium: The Dell; Attendance: 14,793; Referee: David Elleray

8 April 1996 34	Aston Villa	3–0	Southampton	Birmingham
15:00 BST	Taylor 64'; Charles 78'; Yorke 81'; Milošević (yellow card)	Report	Dodd (yellow card)	Stadium: Villa Park; Attendance: 34,059; Referee: Paul Danson

13 April 1996 35	Southampton	3–1	Manchester United	Southampton
15:00 BST	Monkou 11'; Shipperley 23'; Le Tissier 43'; Venison (yellow card) 64'	Report	Beckham (yellow card) 50'; Giggs 88'	Stadium: The Dell; Attendance: 15,262; Referee: Graham Poll

17 April 1996 36	Newcastle United	1–0	Southampton	Newcastle upon Tyne
19:45 BST	Lee 9'; Beardsley (yellow card) 69'	Report	Heaney (yellow card) 61'; Neilson (yellow card) 67'; Le Tissier (yellow card) 78'	Stadium: St James' Park; Attendance: 36,554; Referee: Dermot Gallagher

27 April 1996 37	Bolton Wanderers	0–1	Southampton	Bolton
15:00 BST	Sellars (yellow card) 57'; Coleman (yellow card) 59'; Bergsson (yellow card) 73'	Report	Le Tissier 25', (yellow card) 64'; Benali (yellow card) 65'	Stadium: Burnden Park; Attendance: 18,795; Referee: Gerald Ashby

5 May 1996 38	Southampton	0–0	Wimbledon	Southampton
16:00 BST	Heaney (yellow card) 81'	Report	Perry (yellow card) 68'	Stadium: The Dell; Attendance: 15,172; Referee: Mike Reed

=== Final league table ===
Pos	Team	Pld	W	D	L	GF	GA	GD	Pts	Qualification or relegation
15	Sheffield Wednesday	38	10	10	18	48	61	−13	40	
16	Coventry City	38	8	14	16	42	60	−18	38	
17	Southampton	38	9	11	18	34	52	−18	38	
18	Manchester City (R)	38	9	11	18	33	58	−25	38	Relegation to Football League First Division
19	Queens Park Rangers (R)	38	9	6	23	38	57	−19	33	Relegation to Football League First Division

Source: RSSSF
Rules for classification: 1) points; 2) goal difference; 3) number of goals scored.
(R) Relegated

=== Results by matchday ===
Round	1	2	3	4	5	6	7	8	9	10	11	12	13	14	15	16	17	18	19	20	21	22	23	24	25	26	27	28	29	30	31	32	33	34	35	36	37	38
Ground	H	A	H	H	A	A	A	H	A	H	A	H	A	H	H	A	H	A	A	H	A	A	H	H	H	H	A	A	H	H	A	A	H	A	H	A	A	H
Result	L	L	D	W	D	L	L	D	L	L	W	W	L	L	W	D	D	L	D	D	D	L	W	D	D	L	L	L	L	W	L	L	W	L	W	L	W	D
Position	12	20	19	15	14	16	18	17	18	18	17	14	15	15	14	14	15	15	15	15	16	16	16	15	15	15	18	18	18	17	17	17	16	16	16	16	17	17

Source: 11v11.com
A = Away; H = Home; W = Win; D = Draw; L = Loss

== FA Cup ==
Southampton entered the 1995–96 FA Cup in the third round against local rivals Portsmouth – the first FA Cup meeting between the two sides since 1984, and the first at The Dell since 1906. The top-flight hosts dominated the early exchanges against their First Division opponents and opened the scoring in the 12th minute, when Jim Magilton "bundled the ball in" after Pompey goalkeeper Alan Knight had saved a header by Neil Heaney from a Gordon Watson cross. The Saints came close to making it 2–0 later in the first half, eventually doubling their lead within 50 seconds of the restart when Matt Le Tissier "ran half the length of the pitch" but saw his shot saved by Knight, before Magilton replicated his first goal with another close-range finish. Magilton almost completed a hat-trick a few minutes later, but it took until the last ten minutes for Southampton to score a third, when Neil Shipperley converted a "straightforward chance" created by Le Tissier, completing a 3–0 win described by club historians as "one-sided".

In the fourth round, Southampton hosted Second Division side Crewe Alexandra, who were second in the third-flight league table at the time. Despite the difference in divisions, it was the lower-ranked visitors who opened the scoring after only five minutes, when a cross from Gareth Whalley "drifted" into the corner of Dave Beasant's goal. In response, the Premier League hosts created a number of opportunities to equalise, with Magilton, Shipperley, Richard Hall and Mark Walters all coming close to scoring in the run-up to half time. The Saints eventually drew level just after the hour mark, when Le Tissier "curl[ed] a delightful shot into the top corner" from a setup by Neil Maddison. They came close to winning the tie on multiple occasions towards the end of the game, with saves by Mark Gayle and a clearance off the line by Neil Lennon keeping Crewe in the tie and forcing a replay. Southampton triumphed in the first half of the replay at Gresty Road, with goals from Shipperley, Hall and Jason Dodd putting the visitors 3–0 up within half an hour. Despite their domination of the first half, Southampton came close to losing their lead after the break, as Crewe pulled two back through Rob Edwards and Ashley Westwood.

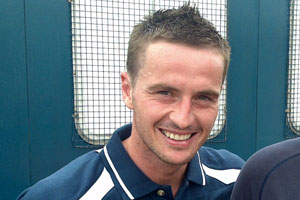
Matt Oakley scored on his FA Cup debut to help Southampton reach the sixth round.

Another Second Division club, Swindon Town, hosted Southampton in the fifth round. Against the run of play, the Robins opened the scoring in the 32nd minute through Kevin Horlock. Dominating the second half just as they had the first, the Saints eventually equalised with just over ten minutes left to play, when Watson headed in a corner from Le Tissier to make it 1–1 and force another replay. In the rematch at The Dell, Southampton came close to breaking the deadlock on multiple occasions in the first half, but were unable to make it through Swindon's aggressive defensive line. They eventually opened the scoring just after the hour mark, when FA Cup debutant Matt Oakley side-footed in a ricocheted ball from the edge of the penalty area for 1–0. The visitors responded well and almost equalised not long after, but it was the Saints who struck again before the 90 minutes were up through Shipperley, who scored from inside the box from a setup by Magilton not dealt with by Swindon goalkeeper Fraser Digby.

In their first FA Cup sixth round appearance since 1992, Southampton travelled to Old Trafford to face Manchester United, who had finished the previous season as runners-up in both the league and the FA Cup. The hosts began strong, dominating possession and creating chances on goal, with Eric Cantona and Andy Cole coming close to breaking the deadlock up front. The Saints retaliated in kind and thought they had scored just before the break through a Shipperley header, but the goal was disallowed as Lee Sharpe had been pushed in the build-up. Shortly after the half-time break, United opened the scoring through Cantona, who "slotted home with the minimum of fuss" from a Ryan Giggs cross. Despite conceding, it was Southampton who dominated much of the second half, winning numerous corners but seeing chances denied by the home defence; and it was the hosts who finally scored a second goal, when Sharpe finished a move started by Cantona in injury time to make it 2–0 and send the Saints out of the competition.

7 January 1996 Round 3	Southampton	3–0	Portsmouth	Southampton
12:00 GMT	Magilton 12', 46'; Shipperley 81'			Stadium: The Dell; Attendance: 15,236; Referee: Martin Bodenham

7 February 1996 Round 4	Southampton	1–1	Crewe Alexandra	Southampton
			Whalley 5'	Stadium: The Dell; Attendance: 13,736

13 February 1996 Round 4 Replay	Crewe Alexandra	2–3	Southampton	Crewe
	Edwards 52'; Westwood 75'		Shipperley 8'; Hall 19'; Dodd 26'	Stadium: Gresty Road; Attendance: 5,579; Referee: Paul Alcock

17 February 1996 Round 5	Swindon Town	1–1	Southampton	Swindon
	Horlock 32'		Watson	Stadium: County Ground; Attendance: 15,035

28 February 1996 Round 5 Replay	Southampton	2–0	Swindon Town	Southampton
	Oakley 62'; Shipperley 76'			Stadium: The Dell; Attendance: 13,962

11 March 1996 Round 6	Manchester United	2–0	Southampton	Manchester
	Cantona 49'; Sharpe 90+2'			Stadium: Old Trafford; Attendance: 45,446; Referee: Steve Dunn

== League Cup ==
Southampton entered the League Cup in the second round against Second Division side Cardiff City. In the first leg at Ninian Park, the Saints eased past the Welsh hosts 3–0, with Matt Le Tissier's first-half opener followed by his second and a Neil Shipperley third within the first five minutes of the second half. In the second leg at home, the FA Premier League side took their aggregate win to 5–1, with Gordon Watson and Richard Hall converting in the second half after Cardiff's early opener to save their side from potential embarrassment. In the third round, the Saints hosted fellow top-flight side West Ham United. After Watson diverted a long-range shot from Shipperley in for 1–0 in the fourth minute, the Hammers responded just after the half-hour mark with an equaliser courtesy of Tony Cottee. It took until the 79th minute for the deadlock to be broken, when Shipperley headed in a cross from Jason Dodd to send Southampton through. The fourth round saw the Saints travel to First Division side Reading. On the back foot from the start, the top-flight visitors were forced to equalise just before the break through Ken Monkou following an early Reading opener. In the second half, Trevor Morley regained the lead for the second-flight hosts and eliminated Southampton from the competition.

19 September 1995 Round 2 Leg 1	(Wales) Cardiff City	0–3	Southampton	Cardiff, Wales
			Le Tissier 27', 47'; Shipperley 50'	Stadium: Ninian Park; Attendance: 9,041

4 October 1995 Round 2 Leg 2	Southampton	2–1 (5–1 agg.)	(Wales) Cardiff City	Southampton
	Watson 53'; Hall 82'		Dale 21'	Stadium: The Dell; Attendance: 12,709

25 October 1995 Round 3	Southampton	2–1	West Ham United	Southampton
	Watson 4'; Shipperley 79'		Cottee 33'	Stadium: The Dell; Attendance: 11,059

19 September 1995 Round 2 Leg 1	Reading	2–1	Southampton	Reading
	Nogan 28'; Morley 65'		Monkou 44'	Stadium: Elm Park; Attendance: 13,742

== Other matches ==
Outside the league and cup competitions, Southampton played one additional match during the 1995–96 season. In April 1996, ahead of the final two games of the FA Premier League campaign, the Saints travelled to face a team put together by the Bahrain national side. They won the tie 1–0 thanks to a 20-yard free kick from Matt Le Tissier.

23 April 1996 Friendly	Bahrain National XI	0–1	Southampton	Riffa, Bahrain
			Le Tissier	Stadium: Bahrain National Stadium

== Player details ==
Southampton used 25 players during the 1995–96 season, 14 of whom scored during the campaign. Four players made their debut appearances for the club, including three of their four first team signings (Alan Neilson, Barry Venison, and Mark Walters) and one signing from the previous season (Christer Warren). Walters also made his last appearance for the Saints during the campaign, as did departees Craig Maskell and Paul McDonald, plus four players sold the next season (Frankie Bennett, Bruce Grobbelaar, Richard Hall, Tommy Widdrington) and one sold the season after (Paul Tisdale). Striker Neil Shipperley, in his first full season at the club, made the most appearances for Southampton during the season, playing in 47 of their 48 games. Shipperley also finished as the club's top goalscorer with 12 goals in all competitions, including seven in the league – joint top with Matt Le Tissier. Goalkeeper Dave Beasant won the Southampton F.C. Player of the Season award for the 1995–96 campaign.

=== Squad statistics ===
No.	Name	Pos.	Nat.	League		FA Cup		League Cup		Total		Discipline	
No.	Name	Pos.	Nat.	Apps.	Goals	Apps.	Goals	Apps.	Goals	Apps.	Goals	Yellow card	Red card
1	Bruce Grobbelaar	GK	(Zimbabwe)	2	0	0	0	0	0	2	0	0	0
2	Jason Dodd	DF	(England)	37	2	5	1	4	0	46	3	5	0
3	Francis Benali	DF	(England)	28(1)	0	1	0	4	0	33(1)	0	6	0
4	Jim Magilton	MF	(Northern Ireland)	31	3	6	2	3	0	40	5	2	0
5	Richard Hall	DF	(England)	30	1	5	1	4	1	39	3	6	0
6	Ken Monkou	DF	(Netherlands)	31(1)	2	6	0	4	1	41(1)	3	6	0
7	Matt Le Tissier	MF	(England)	34	7	5	1	4	2	43	10	10	1
8	Gordon Watson	FW	(England)	18(7)	2	5	1	2(1)	2	25(8)	5	1	1
9	Neil Shipperley	FW	(England)	37	7	6	3	4	2	47	12	1	0
10	Neil Maddison	MF	(England)	13(2)	1	0(2)	0	2(1)	0	15(5)	1	1	0
11	Neil Heaney	MF	(England)	15(2)	2	1	0	2(1)	0	18(3)	2	5	0
12	Tommy Widdrington	MF	(England)	20(1)	2	4	0	2	0	26(1)	2	3	0
13	Dave Beasant	GK	(England)	36	0	6	0	4	0	46	0	0	0
14	Simon Charlton	DF	(England)	24(2)	0	6	0	0(1)	0	30(3)	0	4	0
15	Alan Neilson	MF	(Wales)	15(3)	0	1	0	0	0	16(3)	0	4	0
16	David Hughes	MF	(England)	6(5)	1	0(1)	0	2	0	8(6)	1	1	0
17	Paul Tisdale	MF	(England)	5(4)	1	0	0	0	0	5(4)	1	0	0
19	Mark Walters	MF	(England)	4(1)	1	4	0	0	0	8(1)	1	2	0
21	Frankie Bennett	FW	(England)	5(6)	0	0	0	0(1)	0	5(7)	0	0	0
22	Barry Venison	DF	(England)	21(1)	0	3	0	2	0	26(1)	0	6	0
23	Darryl Flahavan	GK	(England)	0	0	0	0	0	0	0	0	0	0
24	Christer Warren	MF	(England)	1(6)	0	0	0	1	0	2(6)	0	0	0
25	Paul Sheerin	MF	(Scotland)	0	0	0	0	0	0	0	0	0	0
26	Matthew Robinson	DF	(England)	0(5)	0	0(2)	0	0	0	0(7)	0	0	0
27	Matt Oakley	MF	(England)	5(5)	0	2(1)	1	0	0	7(6)	1	0	0
Squad members who left before the end of the season
18	Craig Maskell	FW	(England)	0(1)	0	0(1)	0	0	0	0(2)	0	0	0
19	Paul Allen	MF	(England)	0	0	0	0	0	0	0	0	0	0
20	Paul McDonald	DF	(Scotland)	0(1)	0	0(1)	0	0	0	0(2)	0	0	0
22	Peter Whiston	DF	(England)	0	0	0	0	0	0	0	0	0	0
—	Derek Allan	DF	(Scotland)	0	0	0	0	0	0	0	0	0	0

=== Most appearances ===
Rank	Name	Pos.	League		FA Cup		League Cup		Total		
Rank	Name	Pos.	Starts	Subs	Starts	Subs	Starts	Subs	Starts	Subs	Total
1	Neil Shipperley	FW	37	0	6	0	4	0	47	0	47
2	Dave Beasant	GK	36	0	6	0	4	0	46	0	46
2	Jason Dodd	DF	37	0	5	0	4	0	46	0	46
4	Matt Le Tissier	MF	34	0	5	0	4	0	43	0	43
5	Ken Monkou	DF	31	1	6	0	4	0	41	1	42
6	Jim Magilton	MF	31	0	6	0	3	0	40	0	40
7	Richard Hall	DF	30	0	5	0	4	0	39	0	39
8	Francis Benali	DF	28	1	1	0	4	0	33	1	34
9	Simon Charlton	DF	24	2	6	0	0	1	30	3	33
9	Gordon Watson	FW	18	7	5	0	2	1	25	8	33

=== Top goalscorers ===
Rank	Name	Pos.	League		FA Cup		League Cup		Total		
Rank	Name	Pos.	Goals	Apps	Goals	Apps	Goals	Apps	Goals	Apps	GPG
1	Neil Shipperley	FW	7	37	3	6	2	4	12	47	0.26
2	Matt Le Tissier	MF	7	34	1	5	2	4	10	43	0.23
3	Gordon Watson	FW	2	25	1	5	2	3	5	33	0.15
3	Jim Magilton	MF	3	31	2	6	0	3	5	40	0.13
5	Richard Hall	DF	1	30	1	5	1	4	3	39	0.08
5	Ken Monkou	DF	2	32	0	6	1	4	3	42	0.07
5	Jason Dodd	DF	2	37	1	5	0	4	3	46	0.07
8	Neil Heaney	MF	2	17	0	1	0	3	2	21	0.10
8	Tommy Widdrington	MF	2	21	0	4	0	2	2	27	0.07
10	Paul Tisdale	MF	1	9	0	0	0	0	1	9	0.11
10	Mark Walters	MF	1	5	0	4	0	0	1	9	0.11
10	Matt Oakley	MF	0	10	1	3	0	0	1	13	0.08
10	David Hughes	MF	1	11	0	1	0	2	1	14	0.07
10	Neil Maddison	MF	1	15	0	2	1	3	1	20	0.05

== Bibliography ==
- Holley, Duncan; Chalk, Gary (2003), Bull, David (ed.), In That Number: A Post-War Chronicle of Southampton FC, Bristol, England: Hagiology Publishing, ISBN 0-9534474-3-X
- Juson, Dave; Aldworth, Clay; Bendel, Barry; Bull, David; Chalk, Gary (10 November 2004), Saints v Pompey: A History of Unrelenting Rivalry, Bristol, England: Hagiology Publishing, ISBN 978-0953447459
