= 1994–95 Southampton F.C. season =

Southampton F.C.
1994–95 season
- Chairman: Guy Askham
- Manager: Alan Ball
- Stadium: The Dell
- FA Premier League: 10th
- FA Cup: Fifth round
- League Cup: Third round
- Top goalscorer: League: Matt Le Tissier (19); All: Matt Le Tissier (29)
- Highest home attendance: 15,210 v Queens Park Rangers (15 April 1995)
- Lowest home attendance: 12,032 v Huddersfield Town (5 October 1994)
- Average home league attendance: 14,685
- Biggest win: 6–0 v Luton Town (8 February 1995)
- Biggest defeat: 1–5 v Newcastle United (27 August 1994); 2–6 v Tottenham Hotspur (1 March 1995)
| Home colours | Away colours | Third colours |

The 1994–95 Southampton F.C. season was the club's 94th season of competitive football, their 25th in the top flight of English football, and their third in the FA Premier League. After two seasons finishing just two positions and one point above the relegation zone, Southampton's first and only full season with Alan Ball as manager saw them achieve 10th place in the league – their highest position since the 1989–90 season. The club also improved their form in both the FA Cup and the League Cup, reaching the fifth round in the former (for the first time since 1991–92) and the third round in the latter.

Having brought in several new players in the wake of his arrival halfway through the previous season, Ball made only two signings ahead of the 1994–95 season, adding defender Peter Whiston and goalkeeper Bruce Grobbelaar. Several players were released, including Kevin Moore, Ian Andrews, Steve Wood and Colin Cramb. During the campaign, the club bolstered its attacking force by spending just over £2.5 million on strikers Neil Shipperley and Gordon Watson, while players such as Nicky Banger, Iain Dowie and Jeff Kenna were also sold. The result was a marked improvement on the previous season, as the Saints enjoyed spells of good form both early and later on in the campaign, remaining clear of the relegation zone for the majority of the time.

In the FA Cup, Southampton faced First Division opposition in the third and fourth rounds, beating Southend United 2–0 before facing Luton Town. After a 1–1 draw away, the Saints hosted the replay and thrashed Luton 6–0, their biggest win of the season. In their first fifth round tie in three years, the club hosted FA Premier League rivals Tottenham Hotspur. After holding them to a 2–2 draw for 90 minutes, they conceded four goals from Spurs in extra time to lose 2–6, marking their heaviest defeat in the tournament since 1910. In the League Cup, Southampton beat Huddersfield Town of the Second Division 5–0 in the second round on aggregate, before facing elimination at the hands of fellow top-flight side Sheffield Wednesday, to whom they lost 0–1.

Southampton used 27 players during the 1994–95 season and had 14 different goalscorers. Matt Le Tissier finished as the season's top scorer for the third year in a row with 29 goals, including 19 in the FA Premier League and five in each cup. Jim Magilton made the most appearances for the club during the campaign, playing in every game across all three competitions. At the end of the year, Le Tissier became the first (and to date only) player to win the Southampton F.C. Player of the Season award a third time, as well as the third to win it in consecutive seasons. The average league attendance at The Dell in 1994–95 was 14,685. The highest attendance was 15,210 against Queens Park Rangers in April; the lowest was 12,032 against Huddersfield in October.

== Background and transfers ==
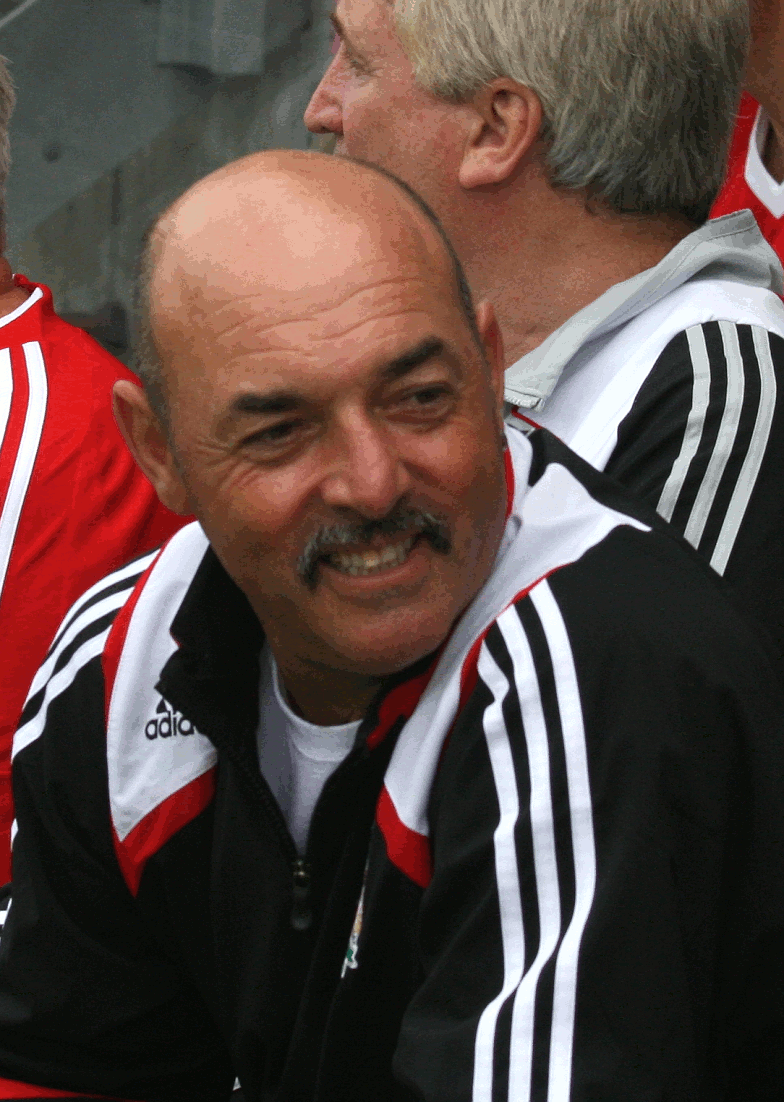
Southampton signed Bruce Grobbelaar from Liverpool on a free transfer in the summer of 1994. He spent 1994–95 as the club's first-choice goalkeeper.

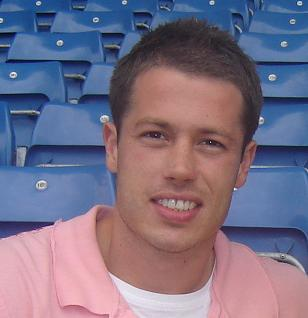
Another summer signing was trainee striker Steve Basham, who would later make the step up to the first team and play 20 times for the Saints.

Having signed a number of players the previous season after taking over as manager in January 1994, Alan Ball made only two first-team signings in the summer ahead of the 1994–95 season: centre-back Peter Whiston arrived from Ball's previous club Exeter City for £30,000, while Liverpool goalkeeper Bruce Grobbelaar arrived on a free transfer. Leaving on free transfers in the summer were centre-backs Kevin Moore, who reunited with former Saints manager Ian Branfoot at recently relegated Third Division side Fulham, and Steve Wood, who moved to Oxford United, who had recently been relegated to the Second Division. During the early stages of the campaign, Colin Cramb – who had made just one substitute appearance since being signed ahead of the previous season – was sold to Falkirk, while out-of-favour goalkeeper Ian Andrews moved to Bournemouth for £20,000. September also saw the arrival of Danish winger Ronnie Ekelund, who joined from Spanish champions Barcelona on loan, with the option for a permanent move for a fee of £500,000.

Ball continued to sell out-of-favour players throughout the course of the season. In October, centre-back Matthew Bound moved to Second Division side Stockport County for £100,000, while striker Nicky Banger was loaned – and subsequently sold, for £250,000 – to FA Premier League strugglers Oldham Athletic. December saw central midfielder Neal Bartlett offloaded to local Southern League club Fareham Town and winger Paul Allen sent out on loan to Luton Town in the First Division. In the new year, Ball spent a club record £1.4 million on 20-year-old Chelsea striker Neil Shipperley, which preceded the sale of Iain Dowie to Crystal Palace for £500,000. Also in January, Allen was loaned out for the rest of the season to Stoke City. The final transfers took place in March, when Jeff Kenna was signed by eventual champions Blackburn Rovers for £1.5 million, striker Gordon Watson was signed from Sheffield Wednesday for £1.2 million, and young winger Christer Warren joined from Southern League side Cheltenham Town for £40,000.

Players transferred in

| Name | Nationality | Pos. | Club | Date | Fee | Ref. |
|---|---|---|---|---|---|---|
| Steve Basham | England | FW | none (free agent) | July 1994 | Free (Note: Steve Basham initially joined as a trainee in July 1994, before turning professional in May 1996.) | |
| Duncan Spedding | England | MF | none (free agent) | July 1994 | Free (Note: Duncan Spedding initially joined as a trainee in July 1994, before turning professional in May 1996.) | |
| Peter Whiston | England | DF | (England) Exeter City | 10 August 1994 | £30,000 | |
| Bruce Grobbelaar | Zimbabwe | GK | (England) Liverpool | 11 August 1994 | Free | |
| Neil Shipperley | England | FW | (England) Chelsea | 6 January 1995 | £1,400,000 | |
| Gordon Watson | England | FW | (England) Sheffield Wednesday | 17 March 1995 | £1,200,000 | |
| Christer Warren | England | MF | (England) Cheltenham Town | 31 March 1995 | £40,000 | |

Players transferred out

| Name | Nationality | Pos. | Club | Date | Fee | Ref. |
|---|---|---|---|---|---|---|
| Kevin Moore | England | DF | (England) Fulham | July 1994 | Free | |
| Steve Wood | England | DF | (England) Oxford United | July 1994 | Free | |
| Colin Cramb | Scotland | FW | (Scotland) Falkirk | 30 August 1994 | Unknown | |
| Ian Andrews | England | GK | (England) Bournemouth | 5 September 1994 | £20,000 | |
| Matthew Bound | England | DF | (England) Stockport County | 27 October 1994 | £100,000 | |
| Nicky Banger | England | FW | (England) Oldham Athletic | 4 November 1994 | £250,000 | |
| Rory Hamill | Northern Ireland | FW | (England) Fulham | 18 November 1994 | Free | |
| Neal Bartlett | England | MF | (England) Fareham Town | 2 December 1994 | Free | |
| Iain Dowie | Northern Ireland | FW | (England) Crystal Palace | 13 January 1995 | £500,000 | |
| Jeff Kenna | Republic of Ireland | DF | (England) Blackburn Rovers | 15 March 1995 | £1,500,000 | |

Players loaned in

| Name | Nationality | Pos. | Club | Date from | Date to | Ref. |
|---|---|---|---|---|---|---|
| Ronnie Ekelund | Denmark | MF | (Spain) Barcelona | 15 September 1994 | End of season | |

Players loaned out

| Name | Nationality | Pos. | Club | Date from | Date to | Ref. |
|---|---|---|---|---|---|---|
| Nicky Banger | England | FW | (England) Oldham Athletic | October 1994 | November 1994 | |
| Paul Allen | England | MF | (England) Luton Town | 9 December 1994 | 19 January 1995 | |
| Paul Allen | England | MF | (England) Stoke City | 20 January 1995 | End of season | |

== Pre-season friendlies ==
Ahead of the 1994–95 campaign, Southampton played ten pre-season friendlies. They started their pre-season preparations with a short tour of Northern Ireland, during which they beat Ards 3–1 and Cliftonville 2–1, before losing 1–2 at reigning Irish League champions Linfield. Back in England in early August, the Saints beat Second Division side Leyton Orient and First Division side Luton Town 2–1. The FA Premier League side concluded the pre-season period with a tour of the Netherlands and Belgium featuring five friendlies against local opponents – after victories over ARC (4–1) and Nuenen (6–1, including four goals for Craig Maskell), the Saints lost 2–3 at Belgian side Royal Antwerp, followed by marginal defeats at Cambuur (1–2) and Telstar (0–1) back in Holland.

| 25 July 1994 Friendly | Ards | 1–3 | Southampton | Newtownards, Northern Ireland |
| | | | Heaney; Maddison; Monkou | Stadium: Castlereagh Park |

| 27 July 1994 Friendly | Cliftonville | 1–2 | Southampton | Belfast, Northern Ireland |
| | | | Dowie | Stadium: Solitude |

| 30 July 1994 Friendly | Linfield | 2–1 | Southampton | Belfast, Northern Ireland |
| | | | Capocchiano | Stadium: Windsor Park |

| 2 August 1994 Friendly | Leyton Orient | 1–2 | Southampton | London |
| | | | own goal Maskell | Stadium: Brisbane Road |

| 5 August 1994 Friendly | Luton Town | 1–2 | Southampton | Luton |
| | | | Dowie; Le Tissier | Stadium: Kenilworth Road |

| 8 August 1994 Friendly | ARC | 1–4 | Southampton | Alphen aan den Rijn, Netherlands |
| | | | Banger; Dodd; Heaney; Le Tissier | Stadium: Zegersloot |

| 9 August 1994 Friendly | Nuenen | 1–6 | Southampton | Nuenen, Netherlands |
| | | | Banger; Ekelund; Maskell | Stadium: Oude Landen |

| 10 August 1994 Friendly | Royal Antwerp | 3–2 | Southampton | Antwerp, Belgium |
| | | | Le Tissier; Magilton | Stadium: Bosuilstadion |

| 13 August 1994 Friendly | Cambuur | 2–1 | Southampton | Leeuwarden, Netherlands |
| | | | Heaney |

| 14 August 1994 Friendly | Telstar | 1–0 | Southampton | Velsen, Netherlands |
| | | | | Stadium: Sportpark Schoonenberg |

== FA Premier League ==
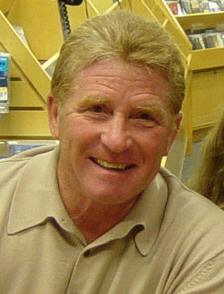
In his first and only full season in charge, Alan Ball led Southampton to a 10th-place finish in the FA Premier League – their best in the top flight since 1990, and the best they would achieve until 2000–01.

Southampton started the 1994–95 season with four fixtures against top opposition: opening week 1–1 draws with the previous season's league runners-up Blackburn Rovers and League Cup winners Aston Villa were followed by a 1–5 loss at third-place finishers Newcastle United (their heaviest league defeat of the whole campaign) and a 0–2 home defeat to Liverpool. The Saints picked up their first victory a couple of weeks later with a late 2–1 win over Tottenham Hotspur, which was followed after another 1–1 draw (with Nottingham Forest) by three consecutive wins over teams slated for potential relegation: 3–1 against Coventry City, 3–1 over Ipswich Town, and 2–0 against Everton. Danish centre-back Ronnie Ekelund, who arrived on loan from Barcelona before the Nottingham game, made his full debut against Coventry and scored in each of the three wins.

After three straight wins which put them 7th in the league table, the Saints suffered three consecutive defeats as they lost 3–4 at Leicester City (who had been recently promoted from the First Division), 0–2 at West Ham United, and 1–3 at home to title challengers Leeds United (in which two goals were scored by former Saint Rod Wallace). The team rescued a point in their next game against Norwich City when a penultimate-minute penalty by Matt Le Tissier secured a 1–1 draw, with a visit to Manchester City the next week ending in a 3–3 draw in which Ekelund scored his last two goals during his loan spell. Southampton faced Arsenal at home in their next game, which was their first match since allegations emerged that goalkeeper Bruce Grobbelaar had been involved in match fixing; Grobbelaar played the match and kept a clean sheet, as the Saints won 1–0.

It would take another month for Southampton to win again after Arsenal, when a last-minute Le Tissier free kick gave the South Coast side all three points against Aston Villa the week before Christmas. After a 2–3 loss at home to Wimbledon on Boxing Day, the Saints dropped slowly down the table with a run of seven straight draws, ending up 15th by the middle of February. Results in this spell included a 2–2 draw with reigning league champions Manchester United, a goalless draw with Leeds United featuring the debut of new striker Neil Shipperley, and a 2–2 draw at Norwich City which set the new club record for consecutive draws. After a loss at Ipswich Town and two more draws (against Coventry City and West Ham United), the Saints dropped into the relegation zone for the first time all season with a 0–3 loss at title challengers Nottingham Forest.

After three months without a win, the Saints finally picked up their seventh victory of the season when they beat Newcastle United 3–1 at The Dell, scoring all three goals in the last seven minutes of the game (two of which were in injury time) to reverse an early deficit. The team followed this with their first back-to-back win since the previous October, when they edged out 7th-placed Tottenham Hotspur 4–3 to climb out of the drop zone again. After a 1–3 defeat at Liverpool, the Saints won another three games in a row, beating mid-table side Chelsea 2–0 at Stamford Bridge, Queens Park Rangers 2–1 at The Dell, and Wimbledon 2–0 at Selhurst Park. The club extended their unbeaten run to five games with a goalless draw against Sheffield Wednesday, a 3–1 win over Crystal Palace and a goalless draw at Everton, which resulted in them climbing to 10th place in the FA Premier League table. This position was confirmed after a 1–2 defeat at Old Trafford by Manchester United, who were chasing a third consecutive league title, and a 2–2 final day draw with Leicester City, who had already been relegated back to the First Division.

=== List of match results ===
| 20 August 1994 1 | Southampton | 1–1 | Blackburn Rovers | Southampton |
| | Banger 15' | | Shearer 60' | Stadium: The Dell; Attendance: 14,209; Referee: Keith Cooper |

| 24 August 1994 2 | Aston Villa | 1–1 | Southampton | Birmingham |
| | Saunders 32' | | Le Tissier 89' | Stadium: Villa Park; Attendance: 24,179; Referee: Philip Don |

| 27 August 1994 3 | Newcastle United | 5–1 | Southampton | Newcastle upon Tyne |
| | Watson 30', 37'; Cole 40', 73'; Lee 85' | | Banger 53' | Stadium: St James' Park; Attendance: 34,183; Referee: David Elleray |

| 31 August 1994 4 | Southampton | 0–2 | Liverpool | Southampton |
| | | | Fowler 21'; Barnes 77' | Stadium: The Dell; Attendance: 15,190; Referee: Martin Bodenham |

| 12 September 1994 5 | Tottenham Hotspur | 1–2 | Southampton | London |
| | Klinsmann 6' | | Le Tissier 75' (pen.), 89' | Stadium: White Hart Lane; Attendance: 22,387; Referee: Alan Wilkie |

| 17 September 1994 6 | Southampton | 1–1 | Nottingham Forest | Southampton |
| | Le Tissier 54' (pen.) | | Collymore 43' | Stadium: The Dell; Attendance: 14,185; Referee: Mike Reed |

| 24 September 1994 7 | Coventry City | 1–3 | Southampton | Coventry |
| | Dublin 2' | | Dowie 34', 55'; Ekelund 81' | Stadium: Highfield Road; Attendance: 11,798; Referee: Kelvin Morton |

| 1 October 1994 8 | Southampton | 3–1 | Ipswich Town | Southampton |
| | Maddison 53'; Ekelund 65'; Dowie 90' | | Marshall 77' | Stadium: The Dell; Attendance: 13,266; Referee: Gerald Ashby |

| 8 October 1994 9 | Southampton | 2–0 | Everton | Southampton |
| | Ekelund 19'; Le Tissier 72' | | | Stadium: The Dell; Attendance: 15,163; Referee: Brian Hill |

| 15 October 1994 10 | Leicester City | 4–3 | Southampton | Leicester |
| | Blake 3', 53'; Roberts 21'; Carr 82' | | Dowie 78', 90'; Le Tissier 89' | Stadium: Filbert Street; Attendance: 20,020; Referee: Robbie Hart |

| 22 October 1994 11 | West Ham United | 2–0 | Southampton | London |
| | Allen 49'; Rush 62' | | | Stadium: Boleyn Ground; Attendance: 18,853; Referee: Joe Worrall |

| 29 October 1994 12 | Southampton | 1–3 | Leeds United | Southampton |
| | Maddison 44' | | Maddison 54' (o.g.); Wallace 83', 89' | Stadium: The Dell; Attendance: 15,202; Referee: Rodger Gifford |

| 2 November 1994 13 | Southampton | 1–1 | Norwich City | Southampton |
| | Le Tissier 89' (pen.) | | Robins 49' | Stadium: The Dell; Attendance: 12,876; Referee: Paul Durkin |

| 5 November 1994 14 | Manchester City | 3–3 | Southampton | Manchester |
| | Walsh 50', 61'; Beagrie 79' | | Hall 26'; Ekelund 62', 66' | Stadium: Maine Road; Attendance: 21,589; Referee: Mike Reed |

| 19 November 1994 15 | Southampton | 1–0 | Arsenal | Southampton |
| | Magilton 60' | | | Stadium: The Dell; Attendance: 15,201; Referee: Roger Dilkes |

| 26 November 1994 16 | Crystal Palace | 0–0 | Southampton | London |
| | | | | Stadium: Selhurst Park; Attendance: 14,186; Referee: Paul Danson |

| 3 December 1994 17 | Southampton | 0–1 | Chelsea | Southampton |
| | | | Furlong 89' | Stadium: The Dell; Attendance: 14,404; Referee: Rodger Gifford |

| 10 December 1994 18 | Blackburn Rovers | 3–2 | Southampton | Blackburn |
| | Atkins 6'; Shearer 13', 74' | | Le Tissier 65', 78' | Stadium: Ewood Park; Attendance: 23,372; Referee: Alan Wilkie |

| 19 December 1994 19 | Southampton | 2–1 | Aston Villa | Southampton |
| | Hall 8'; Le Tissier 90' | | Houghton 79' | Stadium: The Dell; Attendance: 13,874; Referee: Stephen Lodge |

| 26 December 1994 20 | Southampton | 2–3 | Wimbledon | Southampton |
| | Dodd 11'; Le Tissier 43' | | Holdsworth 20', 72' (pen.); Harford 38' | Stadium: The Dell; Attendance: 14,603; Referee: Graham Poll |

| 28 December 1994 21 | Queens Park Rangers | 2–2 | Southampton | London |
| | Barker 7'; Gallen 49' | | Dodd 14'; Hughes 71' | Stadium: Loftus Road; Attendance: 16,078; Referee: Keith Cooper |

| 31 December 1994 22 | Southampton | 2–2 | Manchester United | Southampton |
| | Magilton 44'; Hughes 74' | | Butt 51'; Pallister 78' | Stadium: The Dell; Attendance: 15,204; Referee: Martin Bodenham |

| 2 January 1995 23 | Sheffield Wednesday | 1–1 | Southampton | Sheffield |
| | Hyde 19' | | Le Tissier 70' (pen.) | Stadium: Hillsborough Stadium; Attendance: 28,424; Referee: Roger Dilkes |

| 14 January 1995 24 | Leeds United | 0–0 | Southampton | Leeds |
| | | | | Stadium: Elland Road; Attendance: 28,869; Referee: Steve Dunn |

| 24 January 1995 25 | Arsenal | 1–1 | Southampton | London |
| | Hartson 21' | | Magilton 74' | Stadium: Arsenal Stadium; Attendance: 27,213; Referee: Dermot Gallagher |

| 4 February 1995 26 | Southampton | 2–2 | Manchester City | Southampton |
| | Coton 24' (o.g.); Le Tissier 60' | | Kernaghan 29'; Flitcroft 88' | Stadium: The Dell; Attendance: 14,902; Referee: Paul Durkin |

| 11 February 1995 27 | Norwich City | 2–2 | Southampton | Norwich |
| | Newsome 37'; Ward 90' | | Hall 33'; Magilton 36' | Stadium: Carrow Road; Attendance: 18,361; Referee: Robbie Hart |

| 25 February 1995 28 | Ipswich Town | 2–1 | Southampton | Ipswich |
| | Mathie 70'; Chapman 77' | | Maddison 38' | Stadium: Portman Road; Attendance: 15,788; Referee: Peter Jones |

| 4 March 1995 29 | Southampton | 0–0 | Coventry City | Southampton |
| | | | | Stadium: The Dell; Attendance: 14,505; Referee: Kelvin Morton |

| 15 March 1995 30 | Southampton | 1–1 | West Ham United | Southampton |
| | Shipperley 48' | | Hutchison 38' | Stadium: The Dell; Attendance: 15,178; Referee: Keith Burge |

| 18 March 1995 31 | Nottingham Forest | 3–0 | Southampton | Nottingham |
| | Roy 38', 81'; Collymore 64' | | | Stadium: City Ground; Attendance: 24,146; Referee: Keith Cooper |

| 22 March 1995 32 | Southampton | 3–1 | Newcastle United | Southampton |
| | Heaney 86'; Watson 90'; Shipperley 90' | | Kitson 18' | Stadium: The Dell; Attendance: 14,666; Referee: Joe Worrall |

| 2 April 1995 33 | Southampton | 4–3 | Tottenham Hotspur | Southampton |
| | Heaney 13'; Le Tissier 44', 58'; Magilton 62' | | Sheringham 17', 59'; Klinsmann 59' | Stadium: The Dell; Attendance: 15,105; Referee: Gary Willard |

| 5 April 1995 34 | Liverpool | 3–1 | Southampton | Liverpool |
| | Rush 28', 50'; Fowler 71' (pen.) | | Hall 13' | Stadium: Anfield; Attendance: 29,881; Referee: Stephen Lodge |

| 12 April 1995 35 | Chelsea | 0–2 | Southampton | London |
| | | | Shipperley 10'; Le Tissier 32' | Stadium: Stamford Bridge; Attendance: 16,739; Referee: Alan Wilkie |

| 15 April 1995 36 | Southampton | 2–1 | Queens Park Rangers | Southampton |
| | Shipperley 50'; Watson 67' | | Ferdinand 63' | Stadium: The Dell; Attendance: 15,210; Referee: Peter Jones |

| 17 April 1995 37 | Wimbledon | 0–2 | Southampton | London |
| | | | Le Tissier 9'; Magilton 30' | Stadium: Selhurst Park; Attendance: 10,521; Referee: Gerald Ashby |

| 29 April 1995 38 | Southampton | 0–0 | Sheffield Wednesday | Southampton |
| | | | | Stadium: The Dell; Attendance: 15,189; Referee: Joe Worrall |

| 3 May 1995 39 | Southampton | 3–1 | Crystal Palace | Southampton |
| | Wilmot 1' (o.g.); Watson 9'; Le Tissier 86' | | Southgate 26' | Stadium: The Dell; Attendance: 15,151; Referee: Graham Poll |

| 6 May 1995 40 | Everton | 0–0 | Southampton | Liverpool |
| | | | | Stadium: Goodison Park; Attendance: 36,851; Referee: Terry Holbrook |

| 10 May 1995 41 | Manchester United | 2–1 | Southampton | Manchester |
| | Cole 21'; Irwin 80' (pen.) | | Charlton 5' | Stadium: Old Trafford; Attendance: 43,479; Referee: Paul Danson |

| 14 May 1995 42 | Southampton | 2–2 | Leicester City | Southampton |
| | Monkou 21'; Le Tissier 56' | | Parker 58'; Robins 89' | Stadium: The Dell; Attendance: 15,101; Referee: Keith Burge |

=== Final league table ===
| Pos | Team | Pld | W | D | L | GF | GA | GD | Pts | Qualification or relegation |
|---|---|---|---|---|---|---|---|---|---|---|
| 8 | Queens Park Rangers | 42 | 17 | 9 | 16 | 61 | 59 | +2 | 60 | |
| 9 | Wimbledon | 42 | 15 | 11 | 16 | 48 | 65 | −17 | 56 | Qualification for the Intertoto Cup group stage |
| 10 | Southampton | 42 | 12 | 18 | 12 | 61 | 63 | −2 | 54 | |
| 11 | Chelsea | 42 | 13 | 15 | 14 | 50 | 55 | −5 | 54 | |
| 12 | Arsenal | 42 | 13 | 12 | 17 | 52 | 49 | +3 | 51 | |

Source: RSSSF
Rules for classification: 1) points; 2) goal difference; 3) number of goals scored.

=== Results by matchday ===
| Round | 1 | 2 | 3 | 4 | 5 | 6 | 7 | 8 | 9 | 10 | 11 | 12 | 13 | 14 | 15 | 16 | 17 | 18 | 19 | 20 | 21 | 22 | 23 | 24 | 25 | 26 | 27 | 28 | 29 | 30 | 31 | 32 | 33 | 34 | 35 | 36 | 37 | 38 | 39 | 40 | 41 | 42 |
|---|---|---|---|---|---|---|---|---|---|---|---|---|---|---|---|---|---|---|---|---|---|---|---|---|---|---|---|---|---|---|---|---|---|---|---|---|---|---|---|---|---|---|
| Ground | H | A | A | H | A | H | A | H | H | A | A | H | H | A | H | A | H | A | H | H | A | H | A | A | A | H | A | A | H | H | A | H | H | A | A | H | A | H | H | A | A | H |
| Result | D | D | L | L | W | D | W | W | W | L | L | L | D | D | W | D | L | L | W | L | D | D | D | D | D | D | D | L | D | D | L | W | W | L | W | W | W | D | W | D | L | D |
| Position | 9 | 13 | 17 | 17 | 15 | 14 | 13 | 8 | 7 | 10 | 10 | 12 | 13 | 12 | 9 | 11 | 13 | 13 | 12 | 14 | 14 | 15 | 15 | 14 | 14 | 15 | 15 | 17 | 18 | 20 | 20 | 19 | 17 | 17 | 14 | 13 | 11 | 11 | 10 | 10 | 10 | 10 |

Source: 11v11.com
A = Away; H = Home; W = Win; D = Draw; L = Loss

== FA Cup ==
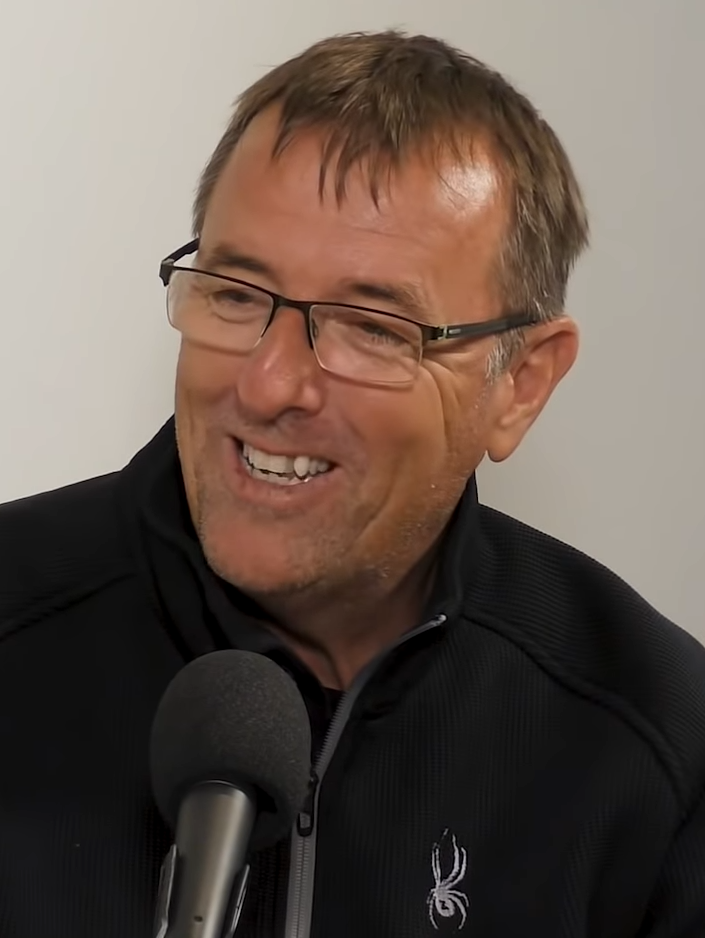
Matt Le Tissier scored in all but one of Southampton's FA Cup games in 1994–95.

Southampton started their 1994–95 FA Cup run in the third round against First Division mid-table side Southend United. The Saints went ahead in the first minute of the game, when Neil Heaney headed in his first goal for the club. Matt Le Tissier put the FA Premier League side two up just before half time, with Southend unable to respond in the second half and the top-flight side progressing. In the fourth round, the Saints faced another First Division club, Luton Town, who had reached the semi-finals of the tournament the season before. Despite dominating the first half, the second-flight hosts conceded first on 53 minutes when Neil Shipperley scored his first goal for the club he had joined just a few weeks earlier, converting a cross from Heaney. Southampton came close to doubling their lead and saw an equaliser prevented by goalkeeper Bruce Grobbelaar, who saved a "dubious" penalty with around 20 minutes left to play. Luton did eventually equalise, nine minutes before the end, through Wayne Biggins. Despite a tough initial tie, Southampton eased past Luton in the replay at The Dell – they went into half-time 4–0 up against the First Division visitors, as Le Tissier opened the scoring in the sixth minute and scored a penalty in the 36th, while Jim Magilton and Heaney also got goals before the break. Second-half strikes from Ken Monkou and David Hughes secured Southampton's biggest win of the season.

In the fifth round, Southampton travelled to face Tottenham Hotspur, who were sixth in the FA Premier League table. The lower-ranked Saints "took control right from the start" and almost went ahead when Le Tissier hit the crossbar in the 10th minute, but it was Spurs who opened the scoring ten minutes later through German striker Jürgen Klinsmann. Within a minute, however, the visitors were level when Le Tissier scored a penalty awarded for a foul of Jeff Kenna. The club's leading scorer came close to picking up a winner later in the first period, before the Saints defended in the second half and settled for a draw. In the home replay, Southampton went 2–0 up in the first half through a 5th-minute Shipperley strike and another Le Tissier penalty – his third of the season against Spurs goalkeeper Ian Walker. Despite the hosts' domination of the first half, Ronny Rosenthal scored two goals in quick succession soon after the break to bring Tottenham even. The tie subsequently went to extra time, when the visitors asserted their dominance and quickly racked up four extra goals within the space of just 18 minutes – after Rosenthal completed his hat-trick, Teddy Sheringham, Nick Barmby and Darren Anderton all took advantage of Southampton's attempts to counter-attack, becoming the first team to score six past the Saints in the FA Cup since Manchester City beat them 5–0 in 1910.

| 7 January 1995 Round 3 | Southampton | 2–0 | Southend United | Southampton |
| | Heaney 1'; Le Tissier 42' | | | Stadium: The Dell; Attendance: 13,003 |

| 28 January 1995 Round 4 | Luton Town | 1–1 | Southampton | Luton |
| | Biggins 81' | | Shipperley 53' | Stadium: Kenilworth Road; Attendance: 9,938 |

| 8 February 1995 Round 4 Replay | Southampton | 6–0 | Luton Town | Southampton |
| | Le Tissier 6', 36' (pen.); Magilton 32'; Heaney 41'; Monkou 51'; Hughes 67' | | | Stadium: The Dell; Attendance: 15,075 |

| 18 February 1995 Round 5 | Tottenham Hotspur | 1–1 | Southampton | London |
| | Klinsmann 20' | | Le Tissier 21' (pen.) | Stadium: White Hart Lane; Attendance: 28,091 |

| 1 March 1995 Round 5 Replay | Southampton | 2–6 (a.e.t.) | Tottenham Hotspur | Southampton |
| | Shipperley 5'; Le Tissier 40' (pen.) | | Rosenthal 57', 59', 102'; Sheringham 113'; Barmby 115'; Anderton 120' | Stadium: The Dell; Attendance: 15,172 |

== League Cup ==
Southampton entered the 1994–95 League Cup in the second round, drawn against Second Division side Huddersfield Town. After a first leg won by a single Matt Le Tissier header in the last minute of the game, the Saints won the home leg 4–0 to advance to the third round, with Le Tissier scoring all four goals (one a penalty, four from open play) to take his tally to five in just two games. They played FA Premier League rivals Sheffield Wednesday in the third round, losing to a single goal from Chris Bart-Williams early into a second half described by club historians as "one sided".

| 20 September 1994 Round 2 Leg 1 | Huddersfield Town | 0–1 | Southampton | Huddersfield |
| | | | Le Tissier 90' | Stadium: Kirklees Stadium; Attendance: 13,814 |

| 5 October 1994 Round 2 Leg 2 | Southampton | 4–0 (5–0 agg.) | Huddersfield Town | Southampton |
| | Le Tissier 41' (pen.), 66', 69', 84' | | | Stadium: The Dell; Attendance: 12,032 |

| 26 October 1994 Round 3 | Sheffield Wednesday | 1–0 | Southampton | Sheffield |
| | Bart-Williams 50' | | | Stadium: Hillsborough Stadium; Attendance: 16,715 |

== Other matches ==
Outside the league, FA Cup and League Cup, the Southampton first team played four additional matches during the latter stages of the 1994–95 season. In April, the club played a friendly against local side New Milton Town which they won 8–0, with Matt Le Tissier scoring five and Jim Magilton adding two. This was followed by a game on the Isle of Wight which the Saints won 3–0. In May, two days after the final day of the league season, Southampton beat Guernsey 3–2, and three days later they concluded their season with a 5–3 win over Yeovil Town in a testimonial for players Mickey Spencer and Paul Wilson.

| 19 April 1995 Friendly | New Milton Town | 0–8 | Southampton | New Milton |
| | | | Dodd; Le Tissier; Magilton | Stadium: Fawcetts Field |

| 24 April 1995 Friendly | Isle of Wight | 0–3 | Southampton | Isle of Wight |
| | | | Jansen; Le Tissier |

| 16 May 1995 Friendly | Guernsey | 2–3 | Southampton | Saint Peter Port, Guernsey |
| | | | Le Tissier; Watson | Stadium: Footes Lane |

| 19 May 1995 Spencer & Wilson Testimonial | Yeovil Town | 3–5 | Southampton | Yeovil |
| | | | Le Tissier; Maddison; Watson | Stadium: Huish Park |

== Player details ==
Southampton used 27 players during the 1994–95 season, 14 of whom scored during the campaign. Eight players made their debut appearances for the club, including five of their six first team signings (loanee Ronnie Ekelund, Bruce Grobbelaar, Neil Shipperley, Gordon Watson, and Peter Whiston) and three players making the step up from youth to the first team (Matt Oakley, Matthew Robinson, and Paul Tisdale). Two of these – Ekelund and Whiston – also made their last appearances for the Saints during the campaign, as did mid-season departees Nicky Banger, Iain Dowie, and Jeff Kenna, plus one player sold the next season (Paul Allen). Midfielder Jim Magilton, in his first full season at the club, made the most appearances for Southampton during the season, as their only player to feature in all 50 games in all competitions. He was followed on 49 appearances by Matt Le Tissier, who finished as the club's top goalscorer with 29 goals in all competitions. Le Tissier also won the Southampton F.C. Player of the Season award for 1994–95, in the process becoming the third player (and first outfield player) to win the award in consecutive seasons, as well as the first (and to date only) player to win the award on a third occasion.

=== Squad statistics ===
| No. | Name | Pos. | Nat. | League | | FA Cup | | League Cup | | Total | | Discipline | |
| No. | Name | Pos. | Nat. | Apps. | Goals | Apps. | Goals | Apps. | Goals | Apps. | Goals | Yellow card | Red card |
|---|---|---|---|---|---|---|---|---|---|---|---|---|---|
| 1 | Bruce Grobbelaar | GK | (Zimbabwe) | 30 | 0 | 5 | 0 | 3 | 0 | 38 | 0 | 1 | 0 |
| 2 | Matthew Robinson | DF | (England) | 0(1) | 0 | 0 | 0 | 0 | 0 | 0(1) | 0 | 0 | 0 |
| 3 | Francis Benali | DF | (England) | 32(3) | 0 | 4 | 0 | 3 | 0 | 39(3) | 0 | 11 | 0 |
| 4 | Jim Magilton | MF | (Northern Ireland) | 42 | 6 | 5 | 1 | 3 | 0 | 50 | 7 | 3 | 0 |
| 5 | Richard Hall | DF | (England) | 36(1) | 3 | 4 | 0 | 2 | 0 | 42(1) | 3 | 6 | 0 |
| 6 | Ken Monkou | DF | (Netherlands) | 31 | 1 | 4 | 1 | 2 | 0 | 37 | 2 | 12 | 0 |
| 7 | Matt Le Tissier | MF | (England) | 41 | 19 | 5 | 5 | 3 | 5 | 49 | 29 | 6 | 0 |
| 8 | Craig Maskell | FW | (England) | 2(4) | 0 | 1 | 0 | 0 | 0 | 3(4) | 0 | 0 | 0 |
| 9 | Neil Shipperley | FW | (England) | 19 | 4 | 4 | 2 | 0 | 0 | 23 | 6 | 3 | 0 |
| 10 | Neil Maddison | MF | (England) | 35 | 3 | 4 | 0 | 2 | 0 | 41 | 3 | 2 | 0 |
| 11 | Paul Allen | MF | (England) | 11 | 0 | 0 | 0 | 2 | 0 | 13 | 0 | 2 | 0 |
| 12 | Neil Heaney | MF | (England) | 21(13) | 2 | 5 | 2 | 2(1) | 0 | 28(14) | 4 | 3 | 0 |
| 13 | Dave Beasant | GK | (England) | 12(1) | 0 | 2 | 0 | 0 | 0 | 12(1) | 0 | 0 | 0 |
| 14 | Simon Charlton | DF | (England) | 25 | 1 | 1 | 0 | 2(1) | 0 | 28(1) | 1 | 1 | 0 |
| 15 | Jason Dodd | DF | (England) | 24(2) | 2 | 3 | 0 | 1 | 0 | 28(2) | 2 | 5 | 0 |
| 16 | Gordon Watson | FW | (England) | 12 | 3 | 0 | 0 | 0 | 0 | 12 | 3 | 1 | 0 |
| 17 | Derek Allan | DF | (Scotland) | 0 | 0 | 0 | 0 | 0 | 0 | 0 | 0 | 0 | 0 |
| 18 | David Hughes | MF | (England) | 2(10) | 2 | 0(4) | 1 | 0 | 0 | 2(14) | 3 | 1 | 0 |
| 19 | Paul McDonald | DF | (Scotland) | 0(2) | 0 | 0 | 0 | 0 | 0 | 0(2) | 0 | 0 | 0 |
| 21 | Tommy Widdrington | MF | (England) | 23(5) | 0 | 5 | 0 | 1 | 0 | 29(5) | 0 | 4 | 0 |
| 23 | Neil Hopper | GK | (England) | 0 | 0 | 0 | 0 | 0 | 0 | 0 | 0 | 0 | 0 |
| 24 | Frankie Bennett | FW | (England) | 0 | 0 | 0 | 0 | 0(1) | 0 | 0(1) | 0 | 0 | 0 |
| 27 | Peter Whiston | DF | (England) | 0(1) | 0 | 0 | 0 | 0 | 0 | 0(1) | 0 | 0 | 0 |
| 28 | Paul Tisdale | MF | (England) | 0(7) | 0 | 0(1) | 0 | 0(1) | 0 | 0(9) | 0 | 0 | 0 |
| 33 | Matt Oakley | MF | (England) | 0(1) | 0 | 0 | 0 | 0 | 0 | 0(1) | 0 | 0 | 0 |
Squad members who left before the end of the season
| 2 | Jeff Kenna | DF | (Republic of Ireland) | 28 | 0 | 5 | 0 | 2 | 0 | 35 | 0 | 1 | 0 |
| 9 | Iain Dowie | FW | (Northern Ireland) | 17 | 5 | 0 | 0 | 3 | 0 | 20 | 5 | 2 | 0 |
| 16 | Nicky Banger | FW | (England) | 4 | 2 | 0 | 0 | 0 | 0 | 4 | 2 | 0 | 0 |
| 24 | Ronnie Ekelund | MF | (Denmark) | 15(2) | 5 | 0 | 0 | 2(1) | 0 | 17(3) | 5 | 1 | 0 |

=== Most appearances ===
| Rank | Name | Pos. | League | | FA Cup | | League Cup | | Total | | |
| Rank | Name | Pos. | Starts | Subs | Starts | Subs | Starts | Subs | Starts | Subs | Total |
|---|---|---|---|---|---|---|---|---|---|---|---|
| 1 | Jim Magilton | MF | 42 | 0 | 5 | 0 | 3 | 0 | 50 | 0 | 50 |
| 2 | Matt Le Tissier | MF | 41 | 0 | 5 | 0 | 3 | 0 | 49 | 0 | 49 |
| 3 | Richard Hall | DF | 36 | 1 | 4 | 0 | 2 | 0 | 42 | 1 | 43 |
| 4 | Francis Benali | DF | 32 | 3 | 4 | 0 | 3 | 0 | 39 | 3 | 42 |
| 4 | Neil Heaney | MF | 21 | 13 | 5 | 0 | 2 | 1 | 28 | 14 | 42 |
| 6 | Neil Maddison | MF | 35 | 0 | 4 | 0 | 2 | 0 | 41 | 0 | 41 |
| 7 | Bruce Grobbelaar | GK | 30 | 0 | 5 | 0 | 3 | 0 | 38 | 0 | 38 |
| 8 | Ken Monkou | DF | 31 | 0 | 4 | 0 | 2 | 0 | 37 | 0 | 37 |
| 9 | Jeff Kenna | DF | 28 | 0 | 5 | 0 | 2 | 0 | 35 | 0 | 35 |
| 10 | Tommy Widdrington | MF | 23 | 5 | 5 | 0 | 1 | 0 | 29 | 5 | 34 |

=== Top goalscorers ===
| Rank | Name | Pos. | League | | FA Cup | | League Cup | | Total | | |
| Rank | Name | Pos. | Goals | Apps | Goals | Apps | Goals | Apps | Goals | Apps | GPG |
|---|---|---|---|---|---|---|---|---|---|---|---|
| 1 | Matt Le Tissier | MF | 19 | 41 | 5 | 5 | 5 | 3 | 29 | 49 | 0.59 |
| 2 | Jim Magilton | MF | 6 | 42 | 1 | 5 | 0 | 3 | 7 | 50 | 0.14 |
| 3 | Neil Shipperley | FW | 4 | 19 | 2 | 4 | 0 | 0 | 6 | 23 | 0.26 |
| 4 | Iain Dowie | FW | 5 | 17 | 0 | 0 | 0 | 3 | 5 | 20 | 0.25 |
| 4 | Ronnie Ekelund | MF | 5 | 17 | 0 | 0 | 0 | 3 | 5 | 20 | 0.25 |
| 6 | Neil Heaney | MF | 2 | 34 | 2 | 5 | 0 | 3 | 4 | 42 | 0.10 |
| 7 | Gordon Watson | FW | 3 | 12 | 0 | 0 | 0 | 0 | 3 | 12 | 0.25 |
| 7 | David Hughes | MF | 2 | 12 | 1 | 4 | 0 | 0 | 3 | 16 | 0.19 |
| 7 | Neil Maddison | MF | 3 | 35 | 0 | 4 | 0 | 2 | 3 | 41 | 0.07 |
| 7 | Richard Hall | DF | 3 | 37 | 0 | 4 | 0 | 2 | 3 | 43 | 0.07 |

== Bibliography ==
- Holley, Duncan; Chalk, Gary (2003), Bull, David (ed.), In That Number: A Post-War Chronicle of Southampton FC, Bristol, England: Hagiology Publishing, ISBN 0-9534474-3-X
