= Jason Dodd =

British footballer (born 1970)

Personal information
- Full name: Jason Robert Dodd
- Date of birth: 2 November 1970 (age 55)
- Place of birth: Bath, England
- Height: 5 ft 10 in (1.78 m)
- Position: Full-back

Youth career
- Bath City

Senior career*
Years	Team	Apps	(Gls)
1988–1989	Bath City	11	(1)
1989–2005	Southampton	398	(9)
2004	→ Plymouth Argyle (loan)	4	(0)
2005	Brighton & Hove Albion	7	(0)
2006	Eastleigh	3	(0)
Total		412	(9)

International career
1990–1991	England U21	8	(0)

Managerial career
- 2006–2007: Eastleigh
- 2008: Southampton (joint-caretaker)
- 2009: Aldershot Town (Caretaker)
- * Club domestic league appearances and goals

Jason Robert Dodd (born 2 November 1970) is an English football coach and former professional footballer.

As a player, he was a full-back who notably spent sixteen-years playing for Southampton where the majority of those came in the Premier League. He made just shy of 400 league appearances during his stay before departing in 2005. He also played in the Football League for Plymouth Argyle and Brighton & Hove Albion, as well as non-league sides Bath City and Eastleigh. He was capped eight times at England U21 level.

Following retirement, he became manager of Eastleigh but left the club in 2007, returning to Southampton as a first team coach where he briefly managed the Saints on a caretaker basis in 2008. He then joined the coaching staff at Aldershot Town where he once more served as first team manager on a temporary basis before returning to Southampton on a third occasion as their youth academy director. In 2014 he was dismissed and later had a spell with Gosport Borough as assistant coach.

== Playing career ==
Dodd was born in Bath, Somerset and attended the Beechen Cliff School. He joined Southampton from Bath City in 1989 for a fee of £15,000.

In December 2003, Dodd was initially credited with scoring a goal directly from a corner against Saints' rivals Portsmouth, but this was subsequently listed as an own goal by defender Sebastien Schemmel.

He was due to retire at the end of the 2004–05 season, during which he spent time on loan at Plymouth Argyle; however, after his contract expired with Southampton he left to join Brighton & Hove Albion. He made only seven appearances for Brighton during his year at the club due to injury.

In July 2006 he joined Conference South team Eastleigh on a free transfer, to play alongside former Southampton colleague, Francis Benali. A recurrence of his ankle injury prevented him playing after the first three games of the 2006–07 season, and he retired from playing in November 2006 and was appointed head coach of Eastleigh.

== Coaching and managerial career ==
The following month he replaced Paul Doswell, who had become director of football, as Eastleigh's manager, but resigned in July 2007 to be replaced by David Hughes.

Dodd returned to Southampton as first team coach under manager George Burley in the summer of 2007, replacing Glynn Snodin. When Burley left in January 2008, Dodd became joint caretaker manager of Southampton, alongside John Gorman. However, on 23 June, Dodd was released by the club.

On 14 October 2009 he became the caretaker manager of Aldershot Town along with his former Southampton teammate Paul Williams after the previous manager, Gary Waddock, moved to Wycombe Wanderers.

On 4 November 2009, Dodd rejoined Southampton as director/chief coach of the club's youth academy to oversee the development of the next generation to come through St Mary's, but was dismissed from the role on 20 May 2014, along with his assistant Paul Williams. Dodd helped bring through a number of players into the first team squad including Luke Shaw, Calum Chambers and James Ward-Prowse.

In late 2014 Jason Dodd was back in football when he joined Gosport Borough as assistant coach. Dodd left after just over a year at the club.

Dodd is currently a member of the Physical Education department at independent school Winchester College.

== Career statistics ==
Appearances and goals by club, season and competition
Club	Season	League			FA Cup		League Cup		Europe		Total	
Club	Season	Division	Apps	Goals	Apps	Goals	Apps	Goals	Apps	Goals	Apps	Goals
Bath City	1988-89	Southern League Premier	11	1	0	0	—		—		11	1
Southampton
Southampton	1989-90	First Division	22	0	2	0	6	0	—		30	0
Southampton	1990-91	First Division	19	0	4	0	3	0	—		26	0
Southampton	1991-92	First Division	28	0	4	0	5	0	—		37	0
Southampton	1992-93	Premier League	30	1	1	0	3	0	—		34	1
Southampton	1993-94	Premier League	10	0	2	0	0	0	—		12	0
Southampton	1994-95	Premier League	26	2	3	0	1	0	—		30	2
Southampton	1995-96	Premier League	37	2	5	1	4	0	—		46	3
Southampton	1996-97	Premier League	23	1	0	0	3	0	—		26	1
Southampton	1997-98	Premier League	36	1	3	0	1	0	—		40	1
Southampton	1998-99	Premier League	28	1	2	0	2	0	—		32	1
Southampton	1999-2000	Premier League	31	0	2	0	4	1	—		37	1
Southampton	2000-01	Premier League	31	1	3	2	3	0	—		37	3
Southampton	2001-02	Premier League	29	0	1	0	2	0	—		32	0
Southampton	2002-03	Premier League	15	0	2	0	2	0	—		19	0
Southampton	2003-04	Premier League	28	0	1	0	3	0	2 (Note: Appearances in UEFA Europa League)	0	34	0
Southampton	2004-05	Premier League	5	0	0	0	0	0	—		5	0
Southampton	Total		398	9	35	3	42	1	2	0	477	13
Plymouth Argyle (loan)	2004-05	Championship	4	0	0	0	0	0	—		4	0
Brighton & Hove Albion	2005-06	Championship	7	0	0	0	0	0	—		7	0
Eastleigh	2006-07	Conference South	3	0	0	0	—		—		3	0
Career total			423	10	35	3	42	1	2	0	500	14

== Honours ==
Southampton

- 2003 FA Cup runners-up medal (Awarded by club for contributions en route to final)
