= Matt Le Tissier =

English footballer (born 1968)

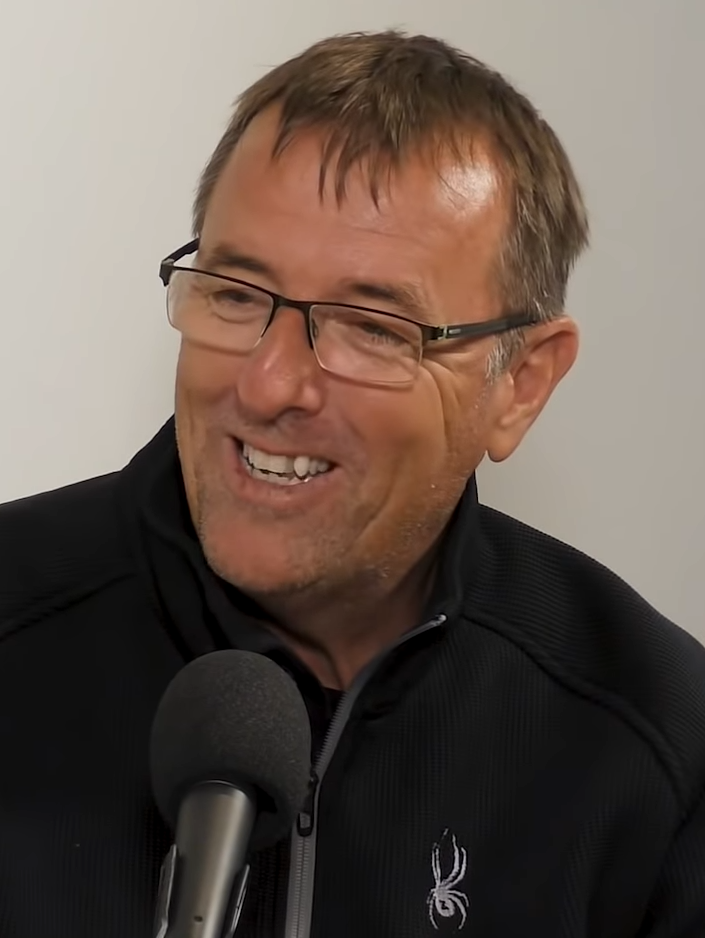
- Le Tissier in 2022

Personal information
- Full name: Matthew Paul Le Tissier
- Date of birth: 14 October 1968 (age 58)
- Place of birth: Saint Peter Port, Guernsey
- Height: 6 ft 1 in (1.85 m)
- Position: Attacking midfielder

Youth career
- 1975–1984: Vale Recreation
- 1985–1986: Southampton

Senior career*
Years	Team	Apps	(Gls)
1986–2002	Southampton	443	(161)
2002–2003	Eastleigh	17	(3)
2013	Guernsey	1	(0)
Total		461	(164)

International career
- Guernsey U15
1986	England Youth	1	(0)
1990–1998	England B	6	(3)
1994–1997	England	8	(0)
- * Club domestic league appearances and goals

Matthew Paul Le Tissier (/ləˈtɪsieɪ/; born 14 October 1968) is a British former professional footballer who played as a midfielder. He spent his entire professional club career with Southampton, before turning to non-League football in 2002; his loyalty garnered special affection from Southampton's fans who nicknamed him "Le God".

Regarded as a creative attacking midfielder with exceptional technical skills, Le Tissier is the second-highest-ever scorer for Southampton behind Mick Channon, and was voted PFA Young Player of the Year in 1990. He was the first midfielder to score 100 goals in the Premier League. He scored 47 penalty kicks from 48 attempts, and is considered one of the greatest ever from the 12-yard spot. Born in Guernsey, Le Tissier opted to represent England, winning eight caps from 1994 to 1997. In 2011, he became honorary president of Guernsey, and briefly came out of retirement to play for the club in 2013.

Following his retirement as a player, Le Tissier became a football pundit, and worked as a panellist on the Sky Sports show Soccer Saturday until August 2020. In his retirement, he has made several posts on social media, concerning COVID-19 and the 2022 Russo-Ukrainian war, which were met with criticism.

== Club career ==
=== Early career ===
Le Tissier was born in Guernsey, a British crown dependency, and played youth football on the island with Vale Recreation between the ages of seven and sixteen. At fifteen, he had a trial at English club Oxford United, but nothing came of it.

=== Southampton ===
Signing for Southampton on Youth Training Scheme forms in 1985, and then signing professional forms in October 1986, Le Tissier made his club debut in a 4–3 defeat at Norwich City in the First Division, and by the end of that season had scored six goals in 24 league games, including a hat-trick against Leicester City in the league. He scored his first two competitive goals in a League Cup third-round replay at home to Manchester United on 4 November 1986, a game which Southampton won 4–1 and was Ron Atkinson's last in charge of the visitors, his sacking coming within 48 hours of the result.

Le Tissier made 19 first team league appearances in the 1987–88 season, failing to score, but in the 1988–89 season, rediscovered his scoring touch and reclaimed his first team place, scoring nine times in 28 league games.

Le Tissier was voted PFA Young Player of the Year for the 1989–90 season, in which he was one of the league's top goalscorers with 20 goals as Southampton finished seventh in the First Division, the club's highest finish for five years.

Le Tissier's highest-scoring league season was in the 1993–94 season, in which he scored 25 league goals. The following season, he won the Match of the Day Goal of the Season award for his drifting 40-yard chip against Blackburn Rovers, scoring against his long-term friend, and former Southampton keeper, Tim Flowers.

Le Tissier's goal tally for the season regularly went well into double figures for the league alone throughout the 1990s, playing a major role in Southampton preserving their top flight status into the new millennium, as they came close to relegation on five occasions in the first seven seasons of the Premier League – including one season when they only survived on goal difference. He was the subject of interest from many big clubs in England and a number from overseas during this time, particularly from Chelsea, Tottenham Hotspur and Manchester United, but the transfer from Southampton never happened and Le Tissier would ultimately remain a Southampton player until his retirement.

In August 1995, Chelsea reportedly made a £10 million bid for Le Tissier, which would have made him the most expensive player in English football at the time. Shortly afterwards, defending league champions Blackburn Rovers were reportedly trying to sign him for a similar fee.

On 2 April 2000, Le Tissier scored a last-minute penalty for Southampton in a 2–1 defeat to Sunderland. This brought his tally of Premier League goals to 100, making him only the sixth player and first midfielder to reach this milestone.

Le Tissier scored the last goal in the final competitive match played at The Dell on 19 May 2001, against Arsenal. This turned out to be his last goal for Southampton. He played several games for the club during the 2001–02 season, the first season at the new St Mary's Stadium, in an eventual 11th-place finish. His final competitive appearance for the Saints came against West Ham United on 30 January 2002. He announced on 29 March 2002 that he would retire from playing at the season's end after limping off with a recurrence of a calf strain during a reserve team game against Charlton Athletic.

Le Tissier's final match, a testimonial against an England XI in May 2002, ended in a 9–9 draw, with Le Tissier playing 45 minutes for each side, while his ten-year-old son Mitchell came on as a substitute in the second half, scoring four times.

Throughout his career, Le Tissier had a fearsome reputation for scoring from the spot, converting 47 of the 48 penalties that he took for Southampton. His sole failure to convert came on 24 March 1993 in a match against Nottingham Forest, his spot kick being saved by Forest keeper Mark Crossley, the feat being so unique that Crossley describes it as the save of which he is most proud.

Le Tissier played in the top division of English football for 16 consecutive seasons, being a regular player for the majority of them, but never won a major trophy or played in a European competition, with Southampton's highest finish during his career being the seventh place final position in 1990.

=== Eastleigh ===
After leaving Southampton, Le Tissier had a two-season-long spell with non-league side Eastleigh, where he played alongside his former Southampton teammate David Hughes. He made his debut in a 3–0 victory over Newport (IOW) in the Hampshire Senior Cup in October 2002. He played his last match for the club early in August 2003, starring in the Hampshire Chronicle Cup Final second-leg victory against Winchester City.

=== Guernsey ===
On 7 April 2013, ten years after retiring from football, Le Tissier announced he had come out of retirement and signed with his hometown club Guernsey. A number of fixture postponements meant that they had to play 17 league fixtures in a month, and Le Tissier announced that he would be able to play in four or five games, also saying he was unable to play Saturday games due to his job as a television pundit on Soccer Saturday. He made his only appearance for the club on 24 April, as a substitute for Ollie McKenzie, in a 4–2 defeat in their Combined Counties League Premier Division clash with Colliers Wood United.

== International career ==
Le Tissier represented Guernsey's under-15 side, playing in the 1983 Muratti Vase final against Jersey U15.

Le Tissier chose to play for England, joining a relatively small group of players who were not born in the country, and earned eight caps over three years. Guernsey, although largely self-governing, does not have an official FIFA national team, which made Le Tissier, as a British passport holder, eligible to play for England. He was picked by the manager Terry Venables to start the ill-fated friendly match against the Republic of Ireland at Lansdowne Road, on 15 February 1995. With Ireland leading from a 22nd-minute goal by David Kelly, a group of England fans rioted, causing the Dutch referee Dick Jol to abandon the match.

In the run-up to the 1998 FIFA World Cup, Le Tissier scored a hat-trick in a 4–1 victory for England B against Russia B at Loftus Road; despite this, he was overlooked by manager Glenn Hoddle for the final squad. He never played for England again after the tournament.

== Style of play ==
Le Tissier was a creative and technically gifted attacking midfielder, with an eye for goal, known for his ball striking, and ability to get into good attacking positions, in addition to his vision, and ability to create chances for teammates; these abilities also enabled him to play as a supporting striker on occasion, or even on the right wing, although this was not his favoured position. Despite his poor work-rate, and lack of notable pace or stamina, he was known for his excellent control, technique, balance, and dribbling skills, as well as his intelligence on the ball, and his use of tricks and feints, which allowed him to beat opponents. He was also known for his extreme accuracy on penalties.

Former Barcelona player and manager Xavi Hernandez idolised Le Tissier in his youth.

== Post-retirement ==
On the former site of The Dell, which was Southampton's old stadium, the names of apartment blocks honour former Southampton players; one is named Le Tissier Court. At Southampton's current ground, St Mary's Stadium, one of the hospitality suites is named after him.

On 7 February 2007, a plane in the Flybe fleet was named after him on his home island of Guernsey.

After Southampton's relegation to level three in 2008–09, Le Tissier initially offered to help with a bid to take over the club, but later withdrew, amidst some controversy.

In September 2009, Le Tissier revealed in his autobiography that he had placed a spread bet on a match he was involved in during his playing career. During an April 1995 match at Wimbledon, Le Tissier stood to win "well into four figures" after betting on the time of the first throw-in. After kicking off, he tried to overhit a pass to unsuspecting teammate Neil Shipperley, but due to nerves, underhit it and Shipperley was able to keep the ball in play. Le Tissier revealed he had "never run so much" in his life as he tried to put the ball out of play to avoid losing money, with the ball eventually going out of play after 70 seconds, meaning Le Tissier and his associates neither won nor lost money. The event was investigated by Hampshire Police, but the Crown Prosecution Service refused to take the case further, citing that it did "not represent appropriate use of police resources" and "would not be in the public interest".

Le Tissier made a cameo appearance for Southampton in Claus Lundekvam's testimonial against Celtic, on 18 July 2008. Lundekvam had previously played with him at Southampton from 1996 to 2002.

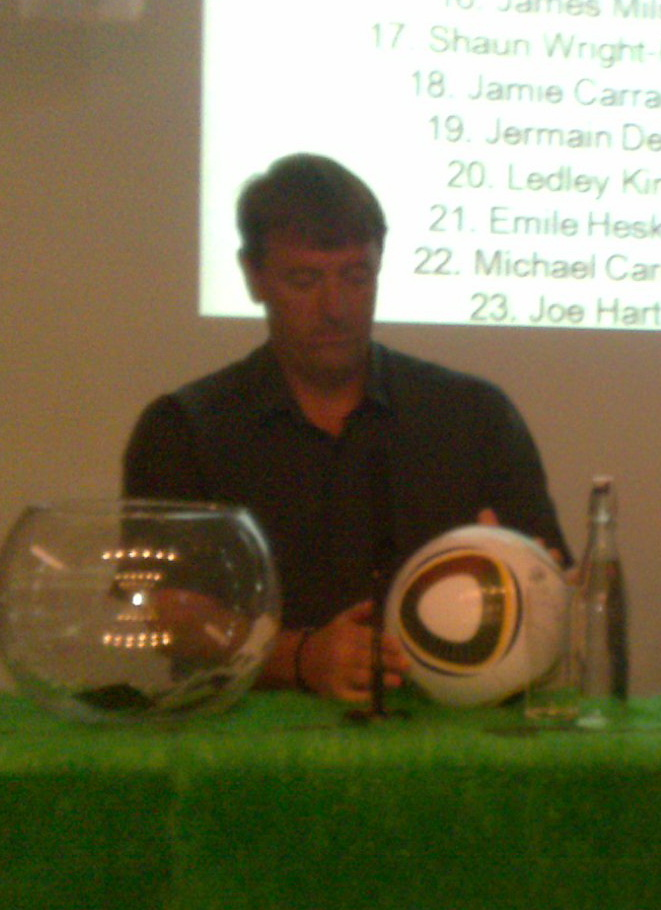
Le Tissier in 2010

In 2011, Le Tissier accepted the position of Honorary President of Guernsey.

In August 2016, Le Tissier and ex-Southampton teammate Francis Benali announced that they had gone into business as football agents. Speaking about their joint business venture, Le Tissier commented that their aim was to provide "guidance and support on every aspect of a footballer's career – on and off the field". Benali added: "We've got a real passion for football and are keen to impart our experience and knowledge to help players make the right decisions for their careers." He was a long-term panellist on Sky Sports show Soccer Saturday until August 2020, when he was dropped. Whilst working for Sky Sports, Le Tissier said that he was required to wear a Black Lives Matter badge and was only told this "about a minute" before the show started. After wearing the badge for one show, he subsequently refused to, and he believed that this contributed to his dismissal.

In 2019 and 2020, Le Tissier featured in both series of ITV show Harry's Heroes, which featured former football manager Harry Redknapp attempting to get a squad of former England international footballers back fit and healthy for a game against Germany legends.

In 2020, Le Tissier became an outspoken critic of the reaction to the COVID-19 pandemic in the United Kingdom. He issued several tweets criticising what he deemed to be an "overreaction" by the government and media, among others, opposing lockdowns and mask orders. An image he posted on Twitter which implied a comparison between the Holocaust and having to wear masks during the pandemic was deleted. In 2021, Le Tissier drew widespread criticism again for promoting unverified correlations, when he suggested that Christian Eriksen's on-pitch cardiac arrest was an adverse reaction to being vaccinated, despite Eriksen not being vaccinated. In November 2021, he faced further criticism, this time by epidemiologists, as one of several former professional footballers "demanding investigations into links" between onfield collapses and COVID vaccinations, after three footballers collapsed in one week.

Le Tissier retweeted a post on Twitter concerning the Bucha massacre, committed during Russia's 2022 invasion of Ukraine, suggesting the media was lying in its coverage of the event. Following backlash, Le Tissier stepped down from his role as a club ambassador at Southampton on 6 April.

On 4 May 2022, the Jersey Bulls cancelled an appearance of Le Tissier after he was previously announced as the special guest at their awards dinner, following fan backlash.

In February 2024, Le Tissier was probed by the Advertising Standards Authority for misconduct while promoting and advertising Supreme CBD, owned by ex-boxer Anthony Fowler. Fowler along with other celebrities, including Paul Merson, Le Tissier and John Hartson, have all been investigated and issued with a warning by the ASA. The ASA investigation concluded that their social media posts have been found to be commercial in nature and not "honest" opinions about the benefits of CBD, since they were being financially rewarded for their posts. The investigation also concluded that the posts made by these celebrities were making unlawful medical claims about the use of CBD, which is prohibited by the Medicines and Healthcare products Regulatory Agency.

In June 2024, Le Tissier joined non-league club Sholing as an associate director.

In April 2026, Le Tissier's return to Southampton as Advisor to the Board, was officially confirmed.

== Personal life ==
Le Tissier married his childhood sweetheart Cathy, and had two children. The couple divorced in 1997; Cathy and the children moved back to Guernsey, after which he had a relationship with Home and Away and Emmerdale actress Emily Symons, before marrying Angela Nabulsi in April 2008 in a small ceremony. Together, they have one daughter. All three of Le Tissier's brothers – Mark, Kevin and Carl – also played football, but never professionally. Mark is currently secretary of Guernsey.

Le Tissier is not related to fellow Guernsey-born football player Maya Le Tissier, although her father did play football with him.

== Career statistics ==
=== Club ===
Appearances and goals by club, season and competition
Club	Season	League			FA Cup		League Cup		Full Members Cup		Other		Total	
Club	Season	Division	Apps	Goals	Apps	Goals	Apps	Goals	Apps	Goals	Apps	Goals	Apps	Goals
Southampton	1986–87	First Division	24	6	1	0	4	2	2	2	—		31	10
Southampton	1987–88	First Division	19	0	1	1	1	1	1	0	—		22	2
Southampton	1988–89	First Division	28	9	2	0	4	2	2	0	—		36	11
Southampton	1989–90	First Division	35	20	2	1	7	3	–		—		44	24
Southampton	1990–91	First Division	35	19	3	2	4	2	1	0	—		43	23
Southampton	1991–92	First Division	32	6	7	1	6	1	6	7	—		51	15
Southampton	1992–93	Premier League	40	15	1	1	3	2	—		—		44	18
Southampton	1993–94	Premier League	38	25	2	0	0	0	—		—		40	25
Southampton	1994–95	Premier League	41	20	5	5	3	5	—		—		49	30
Southampton	1995–96	Premier League	34	7	5	1	4	2	—		—		43	10
Southampton	1996–97	Premier League	31	13	1	0	6	3	—		—		38	16
Southampton	1997–98	Premier League	26	11	1	0	3	3	—		—		30	14
Southampton	1998–99	Premier League	30	6	1	0	2	0	—		—		33	6
Southampton	1999–2000	Premier League	18	3	0	0	3	0	—		—		21	3
Southampton	2000–01	Premier League	8	1	0	0	2	1	—		—		10	2
Southampton	2001–02	Premier League	4	0	1	0	0	0	—		—		5	0
Southampton	Total		443	161	33	12	52	27	12	9	—		540	209
Eastleigh	2002–03	Wessex Premier Div.	17	3	0	0	—		—		1+ (Note: 1 appearance in the Hampshire Senior Cup)	0	18	3
Eastleigh	2003–04	Southern Lge. Eastern Div.	0	0	0	0	—		—		—		0	0
Guernsey	2012–13	C. Counties Premier Div.	1	0	0	0	—		—		0	0	1	0
Guernsey	Total		18	3	0	0	—		—		1	0	19	3
Career total			461	164	33	12	52	27	12	9	1	0	559	212

=== International ===
Appearances and goals by national team and year
National team	Year	Apps	Goals
England	1994	5	0
England	1995	1	0
England	1996	1	0
England	1997	1	0
Total		8	0

== Honours ==
Southampton

- Full Members' Cup runner-up: 1991–92

Eastleigh

- Wessex Football League: 2002–03

Individual

- PFA Young Player of the Year: 1989–90
- Southampton Player of the Season: 1989–90, 1993–94, 1994–95
- Most assists in the Premier League: 1994–95
- PFA Team of the Year: 1994–95 Premier League
- BBC Goal of the Season: 1994–95
- English Football Hall of Fame: 2013
- One Club Man Award: 2015
