= Neil Heaney =

English footballer

Personal information
- Full name: Neil Andrew Heaney
- Date of birth: 3 November 1971 (age 54)
- Place of birth: Middlesbrough, England
- Height: 5 ft 11 in (1.80 m)
- Position: Winger

Youth career
- 1987–1989: Arsenal

Senior career*
Years	Team	Apps	(Gls)
1989–1994	Arsenal	7	(0)
1991	→ Hartlepool United (loan)	3	(0)
1992	→ Cambridge United (loan)	13	(2)
1994–1996	Southampton	61	(5)
1996–1999	Manchester City	18	(1)
1998	→ Charlton Athletic (loan)	6	(0)
1999	→ Bristol City (loan)	3	(0)
1999–2000	Darlington	36	(5)
2000–2001	Dundee United	12	(0)
2001–2002	Plymouth Argyle	8	(0)
Total		167	(13)

International career
1992	England U21	6	(0)
- * Club domestic league appearances and goals

Neil Andrew Heaney (born 3 November 1971) is an English former professional footballer who played as a winger.

Heaney began his career with top-flight club Arsenal before making 61 appearances in the Premier League for Southampton. He played in the Football League for Manchester City, Hartlepool United, Cambridge United, Charlton Athletic, Bristol City, Darlington and Plymouth Argyle, and also had a spell in the Scottish Premier League with Dundee United.

He was capped six times by England U21 in 1992.

== Career ==
Neil Andrew Heaney was born in Middlesbrough on 3 November 1971. He played football for Teesside schools before being signed by London club Arsenal on schoolboy forms in January 1987. While still at school, he was part of the side that won the FA Youth Cup in 1987–88, and he turned professional in November 1989. After spells on loan at Hartlepool United and Cambridge United, he made his Arsenal debut as a substitute against Sheffield United on 18 April 1992. A winger with considerable pace, he was on the fringes of the Arsenal first team over the next two seasons, before being sold by George Graham to Southampton for £300,000 in March 1994. He made eight senior appearances for Arsenal without scoring.

He became Alan Ball's third signing for the Saints (just before the transfer deadline) and scored his first goal against Newcastle United on 22 March 1995. Saints had failed to win a game since before Christmas and had dropped into 20th place, just above the relegation zone. Heaney came on as a substitute with Saints 1–0 down, and with four minutes left he prodded home a loose ball after a save by Pavel Srníček from Gordon Watson's header. Watson and Neil Shipperley completed the scoring to see Saints run out unlikely 3–1 winners. Saints then managed to climb up the table to finish in 10th place. According to Holley & Chalk, Heaney "had the ability and pace to turn matches, but could frustrate with a tendency to run up blind alleys."

Heaney made 61 league appearances for Southampton in two and a half seasons, scoring five goals, before being sold for £500,000 to First Division (second-tier) club Manchester City in November 1996. He was a regular in the matchday squad for the rest of that season, but rarely played during the 1997–98 season, which he finished with a loan spell at First Division rivals Charlton Athletic. He was part of the Charlton side that faced Sunderland in the dramatic 1998 First Division play-off final, a match they won 7–6 on penalties after a 4–4 draw to gain promotion to the Premier League, while Manchester City were relegated to the third tier. After two and a half seasons during which he started just 16 matches in all competitions, Heaney spent the last few weeks of 1998–99 on loan at First Division Bristol City before signing for Darlington in August 1999 on a free transfer. Playing on the left wing, he scored five goals from 36 league matches and became a crowd favourite as he helped the club reach the Third Division play-off final.

He left for Scottish Premier League club Dundee United for a £175,000 fee in July 2000. He lasted 18 months and made just eight starts before leaving by mutual consent; club chairman Jim McLean mentioned him in a list of "players on wages that didn't match what they gave the club in return". He returned to English football with Plymouth Argyle, managed by Paul Sturrock who had signed him for Dundee United, but lasted less than a year of his 18-month contract before recurrent knee problems forced his retirement.

== Personal life ==
After retiring, Heaney left football and became CEO of Judicare, an English firm of solicitors that deals with international legal issues and is known particularly for recovering monies invested into problematic property abroad, based partly on his own problems investing in Spanish property.

== Honours ==
Arsenal

- FA Youth Cup: 1988
- The Football Combination: 1990

Charlton Athletic

- Football League First Division play-offs: 1998

Individual

- PFA Team of the Year: 1999–2000 Third Division
