= Jim Magilton =

Northern Irish football manager (born 1969)

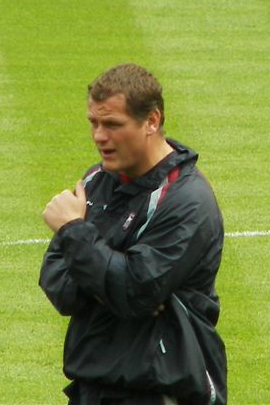
- Magilton with Ipswich Town in 2007

Personal information
- Full name: James Magilton
- Date of birth: 6 May 1969 (age 57)
- Place of birth: Belfast, Northern Ireland
- Height: 6 ft 1 in (1.85 m)
- Position: Midfielder

Team information
- Current team: Cliftonville (manager)

Youth career
- Distillery

Senior career*
Years	Team	Apps	(Gls)
1984–1986	Distillery	1	(0)
1986–1990	Liverpool	0	(0)
1990–1994	Oxford United	150	(34)
1994–1997	Southampton	130	(13)
1997–1999	Sheffield Wednesday	27	(1)
1999	→ Ipswich Town (loan)	11	(1)
1999–2006	Ipswich Town	262	(15)
Total		581	(64)

International career
1990	Northern Ireland U21	1	(0)
1990	Northern Ireland U23	1	(0)
1991–2002	Northern Ireland	52	(5)

Managerial career
- 2006–2009: Ipswich Town
- 2009: Queens Park Rangers
- 2012: Melbourne Victory
- 2015–2017: Northern Ireland U21
- 2021: Dundalk (caretaker)
- 2023–: Cliftonville
- * Club domestic league appearances and goals

James Magilton (born 6 May 1969) is a Northern Irish former professional football player and current manager of NIFL Premiership side Cliftonville.

As a player, he was a midfielder who notably played in the Premier League for Southampton, Sheffield Wednesday and Ipswich Town. He started his playing career in the Irish League with Distillery then signed for Liverpool but would fail to make an appearance. He joined Oxford United in 1990 before moving to the Saints four-years later. He made 581 league appearances, scoring 64 goals during his playing career. He was capped 52 times by Northern Ireland, scoring 5 goals and has represented them at U21 and U23 level.

He moved into management at Ipswich, where he led the club for three years before managing Queens Park Rangers for a brief spell. He has since managed Melbourne Victory, Northern Ireland U21 and Dundalk.

== Early life ==
James Magilton was born on 6 May 1969 in Belfast, and attended St. Mary's Christian Brothers' Grammar School.

== Club career ==
Magilton started out at junior club St Oliver Plunkett, under the guidance of Jackie Maxwell, whose long-term association with the club saw him win the BBC NI Unsung Hero award in 2006. Magilton was a gifted midfield player with an exquisite range of passing who represented Northern Ireland 52 times. He played for Distillery, Oxford United, Sheffield Wednesday, and Southampton before ending his playing career after seven and a half years at Ipswich.

=== Distillery ===
Magilton started his playing career with Distillery in the Irish League, making his senior debut as a substitute against Newry Town in March 1985, aged just 15.

=== Liverpool ===
Magilton served as an apprentice at Liverpool alongside the likes of Steve McManaman and Mike Marsh. He turned professional in 1988 but never made a first team appearance, although he was selected as a (non-playing) substitute in both the 1988 and 1990 Charity Shields. In 1988 Liverpool beat Wimbledon and then two years later shared it with Manchester United in a 1–1 draw, both at Wembley Stadium.

=== Oxford United ===
Magilton was transferred to Oxford United in October 1990 at the age of 21 for £200,000. There he made 150 league appearances before moving to Southampton in February 1994.

=== Southampton ===
Magilton was Alan Ball's second signing a month after being appointed as Southampton's manager, costing the Saints £600,000. Magilton made his first Saints appearance in a 4–2 victory at The Dell over Liverpool on 14 February 1994 in which match Matthew Le Tissier scored a hat-trick. Magilton soon established himself as a commanding presence in the central midfield role. Magilton was described in Holley & Chalk's In That Number as "a neat and indefatigable "fetcher and carrier" between penalty areas."

In the 1994–95 season Magilton started all 42 league games (scoring 6 goals) and continued to feature regularly in the following two seasons under managers David Merrington and Graeme Souness. Following Dave Jones' appointment in the summer of 1997, Magilton rejected the offer of a new contract and, after making 156 appearances with Southampton.

=== Sheffield Wednesday ===
In September 1997 Magilton moved to Sheffield Wednesday for a fee of £1.6 million. He made his debut on 13 September away to his former club Liverpool. He made 22 appearances during his first season at Sheffield Wednesday, scoring once in a 1–1 draw with West Ham in April 1998.

He began the 1998–99 season with Wednesday, although he did not feature regularly for the first team, making only 6 appearances during the first-half of the season.

=== Ipswich Town ===
In January 1999, Magilton signed for Ipswich Town on loan for the remainder of the season. He made his debut for Ipswich on 17 January in a 2–1 away loss to Sunderland. He scored his first goal for the club on 13 March 1999, in a 3–0 home victory over Huddersfield Town at Portman Road. In March 1999 he signed permanently for Ipswich for a fee of around £750,000.

He started the 1999–2000 season as a regular in the Ipswich first-team. He scored his first goal of the season on 30 August, netting in a 6–1 win over Barnsley. Magilton helped Ipswich push for promotion throughout the season, scoring 4 goals in 38 appearances in the league as Ipswich finished 3rd in the First Division. He scored his only career hat-trick in a 5–3 victory against Bolton Wanderers in the 1999–2000 play-off semi-finals on 17 May, securing the club's place in the play-off final with a 7–5 aggregate win, and admitting himself that it was his best ever performance. Magilton started in the final at Wembley Stadium as Ipswich beat Barnsley 4–2, earning promotion to the Premier League as a result.

Magilton continued to be a key part of the Ipswich side during the following season. He scored his first Premier League goal for Ipswich in a 2–1 away defeat to Leicester City on 6 September. He made 33 appearances in the league during the season, helping Ipswich to a 5th placed finish in the Premier League and qualification for the UEFA Cup the following season.

The 2001–02 season was a disappointing one for Magilton and Ipswich, as the club suffered relegation from the Premier League. He continued to feature regularly in the league and in the UEFA Cup for Ipswich at the start of the season, although he did not feature as often during the second-half of the season. Following relegation from the Premier League in 2002, Ipswich went into administration. Magilton was told he could leave the club on a free transfer due to the club's financial troubles, despite having a year left on his contract, however he wanted to stay at the club, stating before the 2002–03 season; "There is no chance of me wanting to leave. I want to stay and repay the faith the manager and the supporters have shown in me." He made 47 appearances in all competitions during the season, scoring three goals.

Following the departure of Matt Holland in 2003, Magilton was named club captain. He signed a new one-year contract with the club in July 2003. On 27 September, he scored a late winner in a 2–1 away win over Watford. He captained Ipswich to a 5th placed finish during the 2003–04 season, qualifying for the play-offs, although Ipswich lost out to West Ham United in the semi-finals.

He signed another one-year contract in July 2004. Ipswich manager Joe Royle also confirmed that he would continue to keep the captain's armband, Royle said of Magilton; "It also shows the quality of Jim that even when he is having an off-day, he never hides on the pitch. He always shows that same 100 per cent commitment and is forever looking to receive the ball. That's a sign of a good player - and a captain." He scored 3 goals in 44 appearances over the course of the season, leading the team to 3rd in the Championship, narrowly missing out on automatic promotion. Ipswich lost out to West Ham United for the second consecutive season in the play-off semi-finals.

A new one-year contract offer was made to Magilton following the end of his contract in July 2005. After spending some time considering his future, the 36 year old veteran midfielder eventually signed a new one-year contract on 8 July. He continued to feature regularly during the 2005–06 season, making 35 appearances across all competitions, scoring once. The 2005–06 season was Magilton's last at Ipswich as an active player however he was registered to play for 2006–07 whilst manager.

== International career ==
Magilton represented Northern Ireland at Under-21 and Under-23 level in 1990, before making his senior debut for his country in 1991. He scored his first goal for his country on 5 February 1991, scoring in a 3–1 friendly win against Poland in Belfast, Northern Ireland. He became a regular player for Northern Ireland, featuring in their 1994 FIFA World Cup qualification campaign. He scored his second goal for Northern Ireland in a qualifier against Albania on 9 September 1992, which Northern Ireland won 3–0. He scored in two other qualifiers against Albania and Latvia in other 1994 FIFA World Cup qualifying matches in 1993. He scored his fifth goal for his country on 11 February 1997, scoring in a 3–0 friendly win against Belgium. He was also part of Northern Ireland's 1998 FIFA World Cup qualification campaign in 1997.

Magilton was named Northern Ireland captain for a match against Yugoslavia on 16 August 2000. He featured regularly in his country's 2002 FIFA World Cup qualification campaign in 2000 and 2001. Magilton won 52 caps for Northern Ireland during his career, scoring 5 goals.

== Managerial career ==
=== Ipswich Town ===
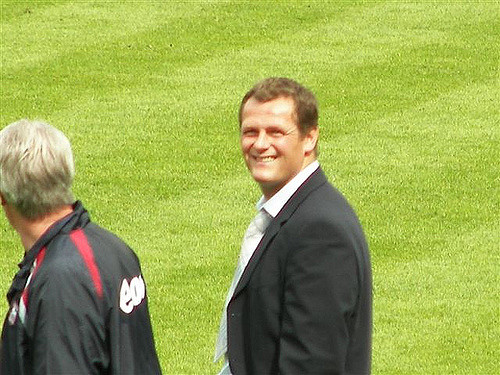
Magilton as manager of Ipswich Town in 2007

Magilton originally intended to secure a coaching role at another club, but made a tentative approach to the Board at Ipswich to fill the managerial vacancy after Joe Royle's departure prior to the 2006–07 season. Magilton was appointed as Ipswich manager on 5 June 2006, alongside former Academy Director Bryan Klug. Although registered as a player, Magilton stated that he would play no more games for the first team during the 2006–07 season, but hoped to turn out for the reserve side. In May 2007, Magilton was linked with the Northern Ireland manager's job after it was vacated by Lawrie Sanchez, but the ex-international decided against taking the post, due to his lack of experience.

In Magilton's first season in charge (2006–07), he led Ipswich to 14th position in the league. Then, in the 2007–08 Season, Magilton lead Town to an 8th-place finish, missing out on the play-offs by a single point. This position was obtained by virtue of Town's excellent home record despite their poor away form. However, despite substantial investment in the squad the team failed to make the play-offs in the 2008–09 season. This led to Magilton being sacked as manager on 22 April 2009.

=== Queens Park Rangers ===
On 3 June 2009, Magilton was appointed the Queens Park Rangers manager until June 2011, replacing Paulo Sousa, who was dismissed in April. On 9 December 2009, Magilton was suspended by Queens Park Rangers following an incident at Watford's Vicarage Road. Magilton reportedly head butted Ákos Buzsáky in a heated exchange with the midfielder, although later reports, from an unnamed source, claimed no such headbutt occurred and that the suspension was in response to an ultimatum from Buzsáky. On 16 December 2009, it was announced Magilton had left Queens Park Rangers by mutual consent.

=== Shamrock Rovers ===
On 6 July 2011, Magilton was appointed as Shamrock Rovers Assistant manager on a caretaker basis after Trevor Croly resigned. Magilton assisted Michael O'Neill for the remainder of the 2011 season, helping the Hoops to their 2nd league title in as many years as well as reaching the Europa League group stages.

=== Melbourne Victory ===
On 7 January 2012, Magilton was signed as head coach of A-League club Melbourne Victory for the remainder of the 2011–12 season, following the dismissal of Mehmet Durakovic. He took over from interim head coach Kevin Muscat after Melbourne Victory's home game on 7 January 2012 against the Newcastle Jets. Upon being appointed the new coach of Melbourne Victory, Magilton immediately went to work strengthening the squad, signing Australian international defender Mark Milligan on loan from JEF United Ichihara Chiba, Hong Kong based Spanish midfielder Ubay Luzardo on loan from Kitchee SC, and Sierra Leonean-Australian midfielder Julius Davies. In his debut match as Melbourne Victory's coach, Melbourne Victory drew 1–1 with Adelaide United. His first win as coach came in round 19, as Melbourne Victory defeated the Central Coast Mariners 2–1. After a lacklusture tenure as coach, in which the Victory recorded two wins, five draws and five losses in 12 games, the Victory failed to make the finals, causing Magilton to state that the club needed to rebuild the squad and change its culture. He went about attempting to achieve this goal by releasing defender Fabio Alves and veterans Tom Pondeljak and Rodrigo Vargas and signing Gold Coast United defender Adama Traoré and Central Coast Mariners defender Sam Gallagher.

After his contract had expired and was not renewed, Magilton left the club on 2 April 2012. It was speculated that Magilton attempted to pursue legal action against the club, on the basis that he had been offered a three-year contract extension, that had then been rescinded., which was confirmed to be a false rumour. With a winning percentage of just 16.67%, Magilton is statistically the worst coach of Melbourne Victory.

=== Irish Football Association ===
On 21 June 2013, Magilton was appointed the elite performance director by the Irish Football Association, signing a four-year contract.

=== Northern Ireland U21 ===
In May 2015, Magilton was appointed manager of the Northern Ireland U21 national team, with Damien Johnson and Kevin Horlock serving as his assistant coaches, and Mark Crossley serving as goalkeeping coach.

=== Dundalk ===
In December 2020, Magilton left his role in the Irish FA to take up a new position as sporting director at Irish side Dundalk. Magilton became interim manager of the first team in April 2021 when Shane Keegan departed the club. His interim spell ended after a run of four wins, three draws and three losses on 16 June 2021, when the club appointed Vinny Perth, who had been sacked by the club ten months previously. On 13 November 2021, it was announced that Magilton had stepped down from his role as Sporting Director less than a year into a four-year contract.

=== Cliftonville ===
On 6 June 2023 Cliftonville announced Magilton as the new manager of the club. On 4 May 2024 Magilton guided Cliftonville to their first Irish Cup title since 1979 against Linfield.

== Career statistics ==
Appearances and goals by national team and year
National team	Year	Apps	Goals
Northern Ireland	1991	6	1
Northern Ireland	1992	5	1
Northern Ireland	1993	7	2
Northern Ireland	1994	7	0
Northern Ireland	1995	5	0
Northern Ireland	1996	4	0
Northern Ireland	1997	4	1
Northern Ireland	1998	1	0
Northern Ireland	1999	0	0
Northern Ireland	2000	5	0
Northern Ireland	2001	6	0
Northern Ireland	2002	2	0
Total		52	5

Scores and results list Northern Ireland's goal tally first, score column indicates score after each Magilton goal.

List of international goals scored by Jim Magilton
No.	Date	Venue	Opponent	Score	Result	Competition
1	5 February 1991	Belfast, Northern Ireland	Poland	3–1	3–1	Friendly
2	9 September 1992	Belfast, Northern Ireland	Albania	3–0	3–0	1994 FIFA World Cup qualification
3	17 February 1993	Tirana, Albania	Albania	1–0	2–1	1994 FIFA World Cup qualification
4	2 June 1993	Riga, Latvia	Latvia	1–0	2–1	1994 FIFA World Cup qualification
5	11 February 1997	Belfast, Northern Ireland	Belgium	2–0	3–0	Friendly

== Managerial statistics ==
As of 20 November 2026

Team	Nat	From	To	Record				
Team	Nat	From	To	G	W	D	L	Win %
Ipswich Town	(England)	5 June 2006	22 April 2009	156	59	43	54	37.82
Queens Park Rangers	(England)	3 June 2009	16 December 2009	23	9	7	7	39.13
Melbourne Victory	(Australia)	7 January 2012	2 April 2012	12	2	5	5	16.67
Northern Ireland U21	(Northern Ireland)	11 May 2013	11 October 2016	18	1	2	15	5.56
Dundalk (interim)	(Republic of Ireland)	19 April 2021	16 June 2021	10	4	3	3	40.00
Cliftonville	(Northern Ireland)	6 June 2023	Present	167	86	26	55	51.50
Total				386	162	86	138	41.97

== Honours ==
=== Player ===
Liverpool

- FA Charity Shield: 1988, 1990 (shared)

Ipswich Town

- Football League First Division play-offs: 2000

Individual

- Ipswich Town Hall of Fame: Inducted 2023

=== Manager ===
Cliftonville

- Irish Cup: 2023–24
- Northern Ireland Football League Cup: 2024–25
