= Keith Cooper (referee) =

Welsh football referee (born 1948)

- Full name: Keith Cooper
- Born: 21 March 1948 (age 78); Wales
- Other occupation: former Referees' Officer, now Football pundit

Domestic
Years	League	Role
1975–1982	Football League	Asst. referee
1977–1982	(Supplementary List)	Referee
1982–1993	Football League	Referee
1993–1996	Premier League	Referee

International
Years	League	Role
? -1996	FIFA listed	Referee

Keith Cooper (born 21 March 1948) is a Welsh former football referee in the English Football League and Premier League and was also on the Welsh FIFA list. During his time on the List, he was based in Pontypridd.

== Career ==
Cooper became a Football League linesman in 1975. Two years later he was included on the Supplementary List of referees at the age of only twenty-nine. This was the last year that a supplementary list operated – ever since referees have been promoted directly to the full List. He did not gain promotion for the following season and indeed had to wait another four years before reaching the Referees' List for season 1982–83.

By the late 1980s, he was a frequent performer in the top division. He was not selected initially for the new Premier League in 1992 but in January 1993 he made the breakthrough with a match between Aston Villa and Middlesbrough, and remained one of its referees for the rest of his career. His most senior domestic match was the 1994 League Cup Final between Aston Villa and Manchester United. Villa won this game 3–1, their last goal coming from a Dean Saunders penalty after Andrei Kanchelskis had handled on the line and was dismissed.^{†}

Cooper completed two more seasons, operating entirely in the Premier League and Cups (as was standard for Premier referees at the time) before retiring in 1996. He later became a Football League assessor.

At the international level, he handled a number of matches, including a European Championship qualifier between the Republic of Ireland and Luxembourg in September 1987.

== Retirement ==
Upon retirement, Cooper became Referees’ Officer for Wales. He has now retired from that position, and has contributed to radio broadcasts as a football pundit. He has also worked in education within Torfaen and Caerphilly County Borough Councils, working with children with special needs, especially children with sight problems.

== Personal life ==
Cooper's son Steve (born December 1979) is a professional football coach who most recently managed Danish Superliga side Brøndby IF, having also previously been head coach of Nottingham Forest, Swansea City and Leicester City F.C..

On 10 November 2026, is was erroneously reported that Keith had died, however it was later confirmed that he was alive and well.
