= Keith Burge =

Welsh football referee

- Full name: Walter Keith Burge
- Born: 10 August 1950 (age 76); Tonypandy, Rhondda Cynon Taff, Glamorgan, Wales
- Other occupation: Civil servant

Domestic
Years	League	Role
1986-1992	Football League	Referee
1992-1999	Premier League	Referee

International
Years	League	Role
1986-1995	FIFA listed	Referee

William Keith Burge (known as Keith Burge and born 10 August 1950) is a Welsh former football referee. He officiated in the English Football League and Premier League, and for FIFA. He hails from Tonypandy in the county borough of Rhondda Cynon Taff, Glamorgan. His other occupation is as a civil servant.

== Career ==
He was appointed as a referee to the Football League in 1986, at the age of thirty-five - the last Welsh referee to join the English list, as this option was withdrawn by UEFA in 1997.

He was on the first list of referees to officiate in the new Premier League for the 1992-93 season, and made his debut there on 5 September 1992, taking charge of the 3–2 win by Wimbledon over Arsenal at Plough Lane.

He was a FIFA official until 1995, when he reached the international retirement age of forty-five. One of his last appointments was in the Euro '96 qualifying tournament, when Lithuania drew 0–0 at home to Croatia on 29 March 1995.

Domestically, he retained his place on the Premier League list for six seasons, until he retired from refereeing completely after his final match in the Premier League, a 2–1 win by Manchester United over Aston Villa at Old Trafford on 1 May 1999.
