= Gordon Watson (footballer, born 1971) =

English footballer

Personal information
- Date of birth: 20 March 1971 (age 55)
- Place of birth: Sidcup, England
- Height: 5 ft 7 in (1.70 m)
- Position: Forward

Youth career
- Charlton Athletic

Senior career*
| Years | Team | Apps | (Gls) |
| 1989–1991 | Charlton Athletic | 31 | (7) |
| 1991–1995 | Sheffield Wednesday | 66 | (15) |
| 1995–1997 | Southampton | 52 | (8) |
| 1997–1999 | Bradford City | 21 | (5) |
| 1999–2000 | AFC Bournemouth | 6 | (0) |
| 2000–2001 | Portsmouth | 0 | (0) |
| 2001–2003 | Hartlepool United | 49 | (23) |
| Total | | 225 | (58) |

International career
| 1991 | England U21 | 2 | (1) |
- * Club domestic league appearances and goals

Gordon Watson (born 20 March 1971) is an English former professional footballer, scout and sports co-commentator.

As a player, he was a forward who notably played in the Premier League for Sheffield Wednesday and Southampton, as well as in the Football League for Charlton Athletic, Bradford City, AFC Bournemouth and Hartlepool United, he made over 200 appearances throughout his career and was capped twice at England U21 level, scoring once.

Since retirement, Watson has worked as a scout for Leicester City as well as working for BBC Radio Solent as a co-commentator on Southampton games.

== Early and personal life ==
Born in Sidcup, Watson grew up in children's homes in London. Throughout his career he was known as "Flash", after the comic book hero, Flash Gordon.

== Club career ==
=== Charlton Athletic ===
Watson started his career with the youth team of Charlton Athletic. He made a "successful transition" into the senior squad, scoring seven goals in 31 appearances for them in the Football League.

=== Sheffield Wednesday ===
He signed for Sheffield Wednesday for a fee of £250,000, with a further £100,000 payable depending on appearances. He made his debut for the club in March 1991. He made his last appearance for the club in May 1995. He scored 15 goals in 66 Football League appearances for them, scoring six further goals in 21 appearances in other competitions.

In March 1995, after four years at Hillsborough, Watson was signed by relegation-threatened Southampton (under manager Alan Ball) for a fee of £1,200,000.

=== Southampton ===
He made his Saints debut at Nottingham Forest on 18 March 1995 and scored against Newcastle United in his home debut four days later as the Saints came from a goal down after 89 minutes to snatch a "priceless" 3–1 victory. Watson went on to make 12 Premier League appearances (scoring three goals) in the 1994–95 season as Saints lifted themselves to a 10th-place finish.

According to Holley & Chalk's In That Number, Watson was "an effervescent, never-say-die forward, the sort the crowd always love and, although not the most skilful of front-runners, he had a swashbuckling style that unnerved defences."

Alan Ball left The Dell at the end of the 1994–95 season, to be replaced by Dave Merrington. The 1995–96 season was a poor one for both the Saints (finishing in 17th place, just above the relegation zone) and Watson, with only three goals from 25 league appearances, with the goal-scoring being shared by Matthew Le Tissier and Neil Shipperley, with seven league goals each. For 1996–97, Saints appointed a new manager in Graeme Souness who brought in Egil Østenstad as first choice striker to play alongside Le Tissier, leaving Watson to make only the occasional appearance. His final appearance for The Saints was in a humiliating FA Cup defeat at Elm Park, Reading on 4 January 1997.

=== Bradford City ===
Two weeks later, Watson was sold to Bradford City for £500,000 and was the club's then record signing.

On 1 February 1997, while making his third appearance for Bradford City, he suffered a double fracture of his right leg in a tackle with Huddersfield Town defender Kevin Gray. The tackle was described by football pundit, Jimmy Hill, as "late, dangerous and violent" and was one of the worst tackles he had ever seen.

Watson and the club took the matter to court, suing both Huddersfield Town and Gray for negligence. Watson won the case, and was awarded initial damages of £50,000. Further damages were later awarded, bringing the total to £959,143.

In his second game back for the club after injury, 18 months later, he scored two goals to help Bradford City to victory. He scored a total of five goals in 21 Football League appearances for the club.

=== AFC Bournemouth ===
On expiry of his contract with Bradford City (now promoted to the Premiership) in June 1999, Watson declined the offer of a new contract explaining that he was not "fit enough or good enough to represent Bradford City in the top flight".

In August 1999 he signed for AFC Bournemouth in an effort to rebuild his career but only made 11 league and cup appearances in the 1999–00 season, without scoring.

=== Hartlepool United ===
After leaving Bournemouth he played for the reserve team of Portsmouth. He finished his career with Hartlepool United, scoring 23 goals in 49 games in the Football League. While playing for Hartlepool he continued to live on the south coast, training during the week with the Southampton squad, and flying up to Hartlepool for matches. He was top-scorer for the club during his first season with them, scoring 18 goals in all competitions, and he signed a new one-year contract in May 2002. At the start of his second season with the club he spoke of his desire to help the club get promoted. He broke his left leg in September 2002, playing for the club's reserves in January 2003, before returning to first-team training with the club in February 2003. He had previously spent time recuperating at Lilleshall. In July 2003, after leaving Hartlepool, he was linked with a return to former club Sheffield Wednesday, after trialling with the club.

== International career ==
Watson won two caps for the England under-21 team.

== Personal life ==
After retiring as a player, Watson combined working in investments in the City of London with a media career for BBC Radio Solent. He now lives in Costa Rica and is a host on the BetUS Soccer Channel.

He has also worked as a scout for Leicester City.

In March 2019 he spoke about former club Bradford City's relegation battle, saying it would be a "miracle" if they stayed up, and that they needed a complete overhaul in the summer.

== Bibliography ==
- Chalk, Gary; Holley, Duncan (1987). Saints – A complete record. Breedon Books. ISBN 0-907969-22-4.
- Holley, Duncan; Chalk, Gary (2003). Bull, David (ed.). In That Number – A post-war chronicle of Southampton FC. Hagiology Publishing. ISBN 0-9534474-3-X.
- Chalk, Gary; Holley, Duncan; Bull, David (2013). All the Saints: A Complete Players' Who's Who of Southampton FC. Hagiology Publishing. ISBN 978-0-9926864-0-6.
