= Paul McDonald (Scottish footballer) =

Scottish footballer and coach

Personal information
- Full name: Paul Thomas McDonald
- Date of birth: 20 April 1968 (age 58)
- Place of birth: Motherwell, Scotland
- Height: 5 ft 6 in (1.68 m)
- Position: Winger

Team information
- Current team: Partick Thistle (Interim assistant coach)

Youth career
- 1985–1986: Merry Street BC Netherdale BC

Senior career*
Years	Team	Apps	(Gls)
1986–1993	Hamilton Academical	215	(26)
1993–1996	Southampton	3	(0)
1995–1996	→ Burnley (loan)	9	(1)
1996–1997	Brighton & Hove Albion	52	(5)
1998	Dunfermline Athletic	3	(0)
1998–1999	Partick Thistle	30	(3)
2000–2001	Greenock Morton	33	(3)
2001–2003	Hamilton Academical	41	(0)

Managerial career
- 2017: Kilmarnock (interim)
- * Club domestic league appearances and goals

Paul Thomas McDonald (born 20 April 1968) is a Scottish former footballer who played as a winger.

== Playing career ==
After playing for a local boys' club in his home town McDonald was spotted by Hamilton Academical and signed for the club in June 1986. McDonald, who usually featured on the left wing played at the club during a period of comparative success, picking up winners medals for the First Division in 1987–88 and the Scottish Challenge Cup in 1992 and 1993. After a long spell at the Accies he was signed by Southampton for £75,000 in the summer of 1993. McDonald failed to make an impact at The Dell, although a successful loan spell at Burnley prompted Brighton & Hove Albion to pay £25,000 for his services in 1996. He left the club the following year and returned to Scottish football, with spells at Dunfermline Athletic, Partick Thistle and Greenock Morton before returning to Hamilton for a final two season run in 2001.

== Coaching career ==
After this spell with the Accies, McDonald, who had also been serving the club as Youth Development Manager from 2002, retired from playing and became the SFA community coach at Kilmarnock. McDonald was placed in temporary charge of the Kilmarnock first team in October 2017, after the departure of Lee McCulloch.

In December 2021, McDonald was announced as the new director of the Thistle Weir Youth Academy at Partick Thistle. In March 2023, following the promotion of the academy's head of youth Kris Doolan to the position of first team manager, McDonald joined the first team coaching staff serving as interim assistant coach.

== Managerial statistics ==
As of match played 10 October 2017

Managerial record by team and tenure
Team	Nat	From	To	Record								Ref
Team	Nat	From	To	G	W	D	L	GF	GA	GD	Win %	Ref
Kilmarnock (interim)	(Scotland)	10 October 2017	16 October 2017	1	1	0	0	2	0	+2	100.00	
Total				1	1	0	0	2	0	+2	100.00	—
