= Roger Dilkes =

English football referee

Lawrence Roger Dilkes
- Full name: Lawrence Roger Dilkes
- Born: August 16, 1948 (age 78); Mossley, Lancashire, England

Domestic
Years	League	Role
1980–1983	The Football League	Assistant referee
1983–1997	The Football League	Referee
1992–1997	Premier League	Referee

Lawrence Roger Dilkes (born 16 August 1948) is an English former football referee who officiated in the Football League and Premier League. During his time on the National List he was based in Mossley, Lancashire.

== Career ==
Dilkes became a Football League linesman in 1980 and reached the Referees List just three years later at the age of thirty four. In March 1988 he handled the Merseyside derby between Everton and Liverpool. This would be a key match in any circumstances but took on far greater significance as Liverpool were aiming to set a (then) record of thirty matches unbeaten from the start of the season. Everton won 1–0, inflicting one of only two League defeats all season on Liverpool, who subsequently won the Title.

He continued to receive good appointments, many in the old First Division, as well as Lancashire derbies. He did not achieve FIFA status - he may have been unlucky in that only one vacancy occurred during his most eligible years. When more opportunities arose in 1992 he was then too old according to FIFA's newly introduced age criteria.

Dilkes was nevertheless chosen as one of the first set of Premier League referees for the 1992–93 season, and he retained this position for the final five years of his career. This period also saw him handle his most senior Cup appointments. The pinnacle was an FA Cup semi-final in 1994 between Chelsea and Luton Town. Two years later he officiated in a League Cup semi-final second leg as Leeds United overcame Birmingham City. The following year he took charge of an FA Cup quarter-final between Sheffield Wednesday and Wimbledon before retiring at the end of the 1996–97 campaign.
