= Peter Whiston =

English footballer

Personal information
- Full name: Peter Michael Whiston
- Date of birth: 4 January 1968 (age 58)
- Place of birth: Widnes, England
- Position: Central defender

Senior career*
Years	Team	Apps	(Gls)
1987–1990	Plymouth Argyle	10	(0)
1990	→ Torquay United (loan)	8	(1)
1990–1991	Torquay United	32	(0)
1991–1994	Exeter City	85	(0)
1994–1995	Southampton	1	(0)
1995	→ Shrewsbury Town (loan)		
1995–1997	Shrewsbury Town	48	(2)
1997–2006	Stafford Rangers		
- * Club domestic league appearances and goals

Peter Michael Whiston (born 4 January 1968) is an English former professional footballer who played as a defender.

He played a solitary game in the Premier League for Southampton during the 1994–95 season. He also played in the Football League for Plymouth Argyle, Torquay United, Exeter City and Shrewsbury Town, as well as non-league side Stafford Rangers.

== Playing career ==
Whiston began his career in 1987 with Plymouth Argyle. He later moved to Torquay United in 1990 following a brief loan period. A year later he was on the move again and spent three season with Exeter City where he made 85 league appearances.

In the summer of 1994 he was signed by Alan Ball for Premier League side Southampton, but would only play a single game for the Saints. In 1995 he joined Shrewsbury Town following a loan spell, and later moved to non-league club Stafford Rangers where he spent the final nine-years of his career.

== Personal life ==
Whiston is now a financial advisor.

== Honours ==
Shrewsbury Town

- Football League Trophy runner-up: 1995–96
