= David Hughes (footballer, born 1972) =

Welsh footballer (born 1972)

Personal information
- Full name: David Robert Hughes
- Date of birth: 30 December 1972 (age 53)
- Place of birth: St Albans, England
- Height: 5 ft 11 in (1.80 m)
- Position: Midfielder

Youth career
- Weymouth

Senior career*
| Years | Team | Apps | (Gls) |
| 1991–2000 | Southampton | 53 | (3) |
| 2002–2008 | Eastleigh | 250 | (38) |
| 2008–2009 | Sutton United | 28 | (5) |
| Total | | 331 | (46) |

Managerial career
- 2007: Eastleigh
- * Club domestic league appearances and goals

David Robert Hughes (born 30 December 1972) is a Welsh football manager and former footballer.

As a player, he was a midfielder who notably spent six seasons in the Premier League with Southampton. He also had spells with non-league sides Eastleigh and Sutton United. He briefly managed Eastleigh in a player/manager capacity whilst with the club.

== Playing career ==
=== Southampton ===
Hughes was born on 30 December 1972, in St Albans. After playing youth football with Weymouth, joined Southampton in March 1991, initially as a trainee. He signed a professional contract in August 1991, but did not make his first-team debut until 5 February 1994 (in a 2–1 defeat away to Oldham Athletic) shortly after the appointment of Alan Ball as Saints' manager. He was never a regular member of the first team squad and appeared more often as a substitute than a starter.

In his nine years at The Dell, Hughes suffered several injuries, including broken legs (twice), fractured ribs and back problems which required surgery. When fit, he was an industrious midfielder who could both burst into the box and clear up in defence.

Hughes was a rare goal-scorer, but scored twice in consecutive matches, firstly away to Queens Park Rangers on 28 December 1994 with an acrobatic scissors-kick, and again at home to Manchester United three days later with a right-foot shot, both games ending 2–2.

Hughes's career at Southampton finally ended after a knee injury picked up in the August 2000 pre-season at Aldershot. In his six playing seasons at the Saints, Hughes made a total of 64 appearances, scoring three goals.

Hughes also played at Youth level for England and at Under-21 level for Wales.

=== Eastleigh ===
After leaving professional football, Hughes went into the building trade and in 2002 he joined Eastleigh as player/assistant manager. When Hughes joined, Eastleigh were in the Wessex League but in Hughes' first season they won the title to earn promotion to the Southern League. After one season in the Southern League, Eastleigh transferred to the Isthmian League for the 2004–05 season, from where they were promoted to the Conference South in 2005.

On 9 July 2007, Hughes was promoted to team manager at Eastleigh, following Jason Dodd's resignation. He relinquished this post following the appointment of Ian Baird in October 2007, operating instead as the player/assistant manager.

In October 2008, Hughes resigned from his position at Eastleigh, who were in serious financial difficulties. During his time with the Stoneham Lane club he made over 250 appearances, scoring 38 goals.

=== Sutton United ===
Hughes was snapped up by former Eastleigh manager Paul Doswell, now manager at Sutton United. He made his debut as substitute in the F.A. Cup 1st Round tie at home to Notts County, and was booked. Hughes totalled 28 league appearances and 5 in the cup, and scored 5 goals in the 2008–09 season for Sutton.
