= 2003–04 Southampton F.C. season =

Southampton F.C.
2003–04 season
- Chairman: Rupert Lowe
- Manager: Gordon Strachan (until March); Paul Sturrock (from March)
- Stadium: St Mary's Stadium
- Premier League: 12th
- FA Cup: Third round proper
- League Cup: Fifth round
- UEFA Cup: First round
- Top goalscorer: League: James Beattie (14); All: James Beattie (17)
- Highest home attendance: 32,151 (vs. Arsenal, 29 December)
- Lowest home attendance: 30,513 (vs. Charlton Athletic, 7 December)
- Average home league attendance: 31,716
Home colours	Away colours

The 2003-04 season was Southampton F.C's 26th consecutive season in the top flight of English football, and it was the club's 119th year in existence. The season started on the 16th of August 2003 and ended on the 15th of May 2004. It was Gordon Stratchan's last season as Southampton's manager.

The team was eliminated on the third round of the FA Cup, losing 3-0 to Newcastle United, the match was broadcast live by the BBC. They were also eliminated from the Carling cup, losing 1-0 to Bolton Wanderers in the quarter finals due to a goal in extra time.

== Season summary ==
The previous season's FA Cup runners-up failed to make an impact in any of the cup competitions, and their 12th-place finish was a something of a disappointment after the previous season, when Southampton were eighth in the league - their highest ever in the Premiership and their highest in the top flight since 1990. The club was thrown into further turmoil in March, when Gordon Strachan announced his resignation as manager. There was talk that Glenn Hoddle would be returning to the club for a second spell, but the job went to Plymouth Argyle's Paul Sturrock instead.

== Final league table ==
Pos	Team	Pld	W	D	L	GF	GA	GD	Pts	Qualification or relegation
10	Birmingham City	38	12	14	12	43	48	−5	50	
11	Middlesbrough	38	13	9	16	44	52	−8	48	Qualification for the UEFA Cup first round (Note: Middlesbrough qualified as the 2003–04 Football League Cup winners.)
12	Southampton	38	12	11	15	44	45	−1	47	
13	Portsmouth	38	12	9	17	47	54	−7	45	
14	Tottenham Hotspur	38	13	6	19	47	57	−10	45	

Source: Premier League
Rules for classification: 1) points; 2) goal difference; 3) number of goals scored.

== First-team squad ==
Squad at end of season

Note: Flags indicate national team as defined under FIFA eligibility rules; some limited exceptions apply. Players may hold more than one non-FIFA nationality.

No.	Pos.	Nation	Player
2	DF	ENG	Jason Dodd
3	DF	ENG	Graeme Le Saux
5	DF	NOR	Claus Lundekvam
6	DF	SCO	Stephen Crainey
7	FW	ENG	Kevin Phillips
8	MF	ENG	Matt Oakley
9	FW	ENG	James Beattie
10	MF	SCO	Neil McCann
11	DF	SWE	Michael Svensson
12	MF	SWE	Anders Svensson
14	GK	FIN	Antti Niemi
15	DF	ENG	Fitz Hall
16	DF	ENG	Martin Cranie
17	FW	LAT	Marian Pahars

No.	Pos.	Nation	Player
18	MF	IRL	Rory Delap
19	DF	ENG	Danny Higginbotham
20	MF	ENG	David Prutton
21	FW	NOR	Jo Tessem
22	DF	ENG	Darren Kenton
28	GK	NIR	Alan Blayney
29	MF	FRA	Fabrice Fernandes
30	MF	FRA	Léandre Griffit
31	MF	FRA	Yoann Folly
32	DF	NIR	Chris Baird
33	DF	SCO	Paul Telfer
34	FW	ECU	Agustin Delgado
36	FW	ENG	Brett Ormerod

=== Left club during season ===
Note: Flags indicate national team as defined under FIFA eligibility rules; some limited exceptions apply. Players may hold more than one non-FIFA nationality.

No.	Pos.	Nation	Player
1	GK	WAL	Paul Jones (to Wolverhampton Wanderers)
4	MF	ENG	Chris Marsden (to Busan I'cons)
6	DF	ENG	Paul Williams (to Stoke City)
16	MF	ENG	Mark Draper (retired)

No.	Pos.	Nation	Player
21	FW	NOR	Jo Tessem (on loan to Lyn)
25	DF	ENG	Garry Monk (to Barnsley)
27	GK	ENG	Scott Bevan (to Wimbledon)

== Reserve squad ==
The following players did not appear for the first team this season.

Note: Flags indicate national team as defined under FIFA eligibility rules; some limited exceptions apply. Players may hold more than one non-FIFA nationality.

No.	Pos.	Nation	Player
13	GK	ENG	Paul Smith
23	MF	WAL	Arron Davies
24	FW	ENG	Dexter Blackstock
25	GK	ENG	Michael Poke
26	DF	ENG	Matt Mills
27	FW	ENG	Leon Best
35	DF	ENG	Mike Williamson
—	DF	ENG	Francis Benali

No.	Pos.	Nation	Player
—	DF	ENG	Luke Byles
—	DF	ENG	Michael Green
—	MF	ENG	Simon Gillett
—	MF	WAL	Richard Jones (on loan to Swansea City)
—	MF	ESP	Jacinto Elá
—	MF	UKR	Andrejs Perepļotkins (on loan to Bohemians)
—	MF	RSA	Drew Surman

== Youth squad ==
Note: Flags indicate national team as defined under FIFA eligibility rules; some limited exceptions apply. Players may hold more than one non-FIFA nationality.

No.	Pos.	Nation	Player
—	GK	SCO	Andrew McNeil
—	DF	ENG	Kyle Critchell
—	DF	WAL	Gareth Bale
—	DF	FRA	Sebastian Wallis-Taylor
—	MF	ENG	Nathan Dyer
—	MF	ENG	Lloyd James

No.	Pos.	Nation	Player
—	MF	ENG	Adam Lallana
—	MF	POR	Feliciano Condesso
—	MF	FIN	Tim Sparv
—	FW	ENG	Theo Walcott
—	FW	ENG	Josh Dutton-Black

== Results ==
=== Premier League ===
16 August 2003 1	Leicester City	2–2	Southampton	Leicester, Leicestershire
BST (UTC+01)	Dickov 5' (pen.); Ferdinand 10'	Report	Phillips 76'; Beattie 80'	Stadium: Walkers Stadium; Attendance: 31,621; Referee: Mike Riley

23 August 2003 2	Southampton	0–0	Birmingham City	Southampton, Hampshire
15:00 BST (UTC+01)		Report		Stadium: St Mary's Stadium; Attendance: 31,656; Referee: Graham Barber

26 August 2003 3	Leeds United	0–0	Southampton	Leeds, West Yorkshire
BST (UTC+01)		Report		Stadium: Elland Road; Attendance: 34,721; Referee: Paul Durkin

31 August 2003 4	Southampton	1–0	Manchester United	Southampton, Hampshire
BST (UTC+01)	Beattie 88'	Report		Stadium: St Mary's Stadium; Referee: Mark Halsey

13 September 2003 5	Southampton	2–0	Wolverhampton Wanderers	Southampton, Hampshire
15:00 BST (UTC+01)	Beattie 37' (pen.), 52'	Report		Stadium: St Mary's Stadium; Attendance: 31,711; Referee: Uriah Rennie

20 September 2003 6	Tottenham Hotspur	1–3	Southampton	Haringey, London
	Kanouté 62'	Report	Beattie 2', 43'; Phillips 60'	Stadium: White Hart Lane; Attendance: 35,784; Referee: Andy D'Urso

27 September 2003 7	Southampton	0–1	Middlesbrough	Southampton, Hampshire
BST (UTC+01)	Phillips (red card) 90'	Report	Christie 13'	Stadium: St Mary's Stadium; Attendance: 30,772; Referee: Barry Knight

4 October 2003 8	Newcastle United	1–0	Southampton	Newcastle upon Tyne, Tyneside
BST (UTC+01)	Shearer 44'	Report		Stadium: St James' Park; Attendance: 52,127; Referee: Phil Dowd

19 October 2003 9	Everton	0–0	Southampton	Liverpool, Merseyside
		Report		Stadium: Goodison Park; Attendance: 35,775; Referee: Matt Messias

25 October 2003 10	Southampton	2–0	Blackburn Rovers	Southampton, Hampshire
BST (UTC+01)	Beattie 59'; Griffit 87'	Report	Cole (red card) 65'	Stadium: St Mary's Stadium; Attendance: 31,620; Referee: Steve Bennett

1 November 2003 11	Southampton	0–2	Manchester City	Southampton, Hampshire
15:00 GMT (UTC)		Report	Fowler 4'; Wanchope 85'	Stadium: St Mary's Stadium; Attendance: 31,952; Referee: Alan Wiley

8 November 2003 12	Bolton Wanderers	0–0	Southampton	Bolton, Greater Manchester
		Report	M. Svensson (red card) 86'	Stadium: Reebok Stadium; Attendance: 25,619; Referee: Howard Webb

22 November 2003 13	Southampton	0–1	Chelsea	Southampton, Hampshire
		Report	Melchiot 47'	Stadium: St Mary's Stadium; Attendance: 32,149; Referee: Dermot Gallagher

29 November 2003 14	Aston Villa	1–0	Southampton	Birmingham, West Midlands
	Dublin 45'	Report		Stadium: Villa Park; Attendance: 31,285; Referee: Matt Messias

7 December 2003 15	Southampton	3–2	Charlton Athletic	Southampton, Hampshire
GMT (UTC)	M. Svensson 14'; Ormerod 45', 85'	Report	Parker 46', 65'	Stadium: St Mary's Stadium; Attendance: 30,513; Referee: Peter Walton

13 December 2003 16	Liverpool	1–2	Southampton	Liverpool, Merseyside
GMT (UTC)	Heskey 75'	Report	Ormerod 2'; M. Svensson 64'	Stadium: Anfield; Attendance: 41,762; Referee: Paul Durkin

21 December 2003 17	Southampton	3–0	Portsmouth	Southampton, Hampshire
GMT (UTC)	Schemmel 34' (o.g.); Pahars 67'; Beattie 90'	Report		Stadium: St Mary's Stadium; Attendance: 31,697; Referee: Jeff Winter

26 December 2003 18	Fulham	2–0	Southampton	Fulham, London
12:00 GMT (UTC)	Saha 19', 63' (pen.)	Report		Stadium: Loftus Road; Attendance: 16,767; Referee: Alan Wiley

29 December 2003 19	Southampton	0–1	Arsenal	Southampton, Hampshire
20:00 GMT (UTC)		Report	Pires 35'	Stadium: St Mary's Stadium; Attendance: 32,151; Referee: Steve Dunn

7 January 2004 20	Southampton	0–0	Leicester City	Southampton, Hampshire
BST (UTC+01)		Report		Stadium: St Mary's Stadium; Attendance: 31,053; Referee: Howard Webb

10 January 2004 21	Birmingham City	2–1	Southampton	Birmingham, West Midlands
15:00 GMT (UTC)	Clemence 16'; Kenna 67'	Report	Ormerod 6'; Prutton (red card) 69'	Stadium: St Andrew's; Attendance: 29,071; Referee: Steve Bennett

17 January 2004 22	Southampton	2–1	Leeds United	Southampton, Hampshire
	Ormerod 36'; Phillips 43'	Report	Kilgallon 75'	Stadium: St Mary's Stadium; Attendance: 31,976; Referee: Alan Wiley

31 January 2004 23	Manchester United	3–2	Southampton	Trafford, Greater Manchester
GMT (UTC)	Saha 17'; Scholes 36' van Nistelrooy 60'	Report	Phillips 37', 52'	Stadium: Old Trafford; Attendance: 67,758; Referee: Graham Barber

7 February 2004 24	Southampton	0–0	Fulham	Southampton, Hampshire
		Report		Stadium: St Mary's Stadium; Attendance: 31,820; Referee: Andy D'Urso

10 February 2004 25	Arsenal	2–0	Southampton	Islington, London
19:45 GMT (UTC)	Henry 31', 90'	Report		Stadium: Highbury; Attendance: 38,007; Referee: Neale Barry

21 February 2004 26	Southampton	3–3	Everton	Southampton, Hampshire
GMT (UTC)	Phillips 58'; Beattie 81'; Fernandes 90'	Report	Rooney 7', 77'; Ferguson 33'	Stadium: St Mary's Stadium; Attendance: 31,875; Referee: Phil Dowd

28 February 2004 27	Blackburn Rovers	1–1	Southampton	Blackburn, Lancashire
	Cole 52'	Report	Phillips 5'	Stadium: Ewood Park; Attendance: 21,970; Referee: Mike Dean

14 March 2004 28	Southampton	2–0	Liverpool	Southampton, Hampshire
GMT (UTC)	Beattie 51'; Phillips 85'	Report		Stadium: St Mary's Stadium; Attendance: 32,056; Referee: Dermot Gallagher

21 March 2004 29	Portsmouth	1–0	Southampton	Portsmouth, Hampshire
GMT (UTC)	Yakubu 68'	Report		Stadium: Fratton Park; Attendance: 20,140; Referee: Mark Halsey

27 March 2004 30	Southampton	1–0	Tottenham Hotspur	Southampton, Hampshire
	Delap 64'	Report		Stadium: St Mary's Stadium; Attendance: 31,973; Referee: Chris Foy

3 April 2004 31	Wolverhampton Wanderers	1–4	Southampton	Wolverhampton, West Midlands
15:00 BST	Camara 72'	Report	Beattie 25'; Lundekvam 58'; Phillips 89', 90'	Stadium: Molineux; Attendance: 29,106; Referee: Mark Halsey

12 April 2004 32	Middlesbrough	3–1	Southampton	Middlesbrough, North Yorkshire
	Juninho 23'; Németh 32'; Maccarone 49'	Report	Beattie 70'	Stadium: Riverside Stadium; Attendance: 30,768; Referee: Dermot Gallagher

17 April 2004 33	Manchester City	1–3	Southampton	Manchester
15:00	Anelka 78'	Report	Beattie 34'; Phillips 55', 81'	Stadium: City of Manchester Stadium; Attendance: 47,152; Referee: Graham Barber

24 April 2004 34	Southampton	1–2	Bolton Wanderers	Southampton, Hampshire
	Pahars 21'	Report	Nolan 77'; Davies 78'	Stadium: St Mary's Stadium; Attendance: 31,712; Referee: Steve Dunn

1 May 2004 35	Chelsea	4–0	Southampton	Fulham, London
	Cranie 59' (o.g.); Lampard 75', 83'; Guðjohnsen 86'	Report		Stadium: Stamford Bridge; Attendance: 41,321; Referee: Paul Durkin

8 May 2004 36	Southampton	1–1	Aston Villa	Southampton, Hampshire
BST (UTC+01)	Phillips 45'	Report	Angel 39' (pen.)	Stadium: St Mary's Stadium; Attendance: 32,054; Referee: Howard Webb

11 May 2004 37	Southampton	3–3	Newcastle United	Southampton, Hampshire
20:00 BST (UTC+01)	Beattie 19'; Bramble 39' (o.g.); Griffit 88'	Report	Ameobi 7'; Bowyer 35'; Ambrose 90'	Stadium: St Mary's Stadium; Attendance: 31,815; Referee: Graham Poll

15 May 2004 38	Charlton Athletic	2–1	Southampton	Greenwich, London
BST (UTC+01)	Euell 36'; Cole 53'	Report	Prutton 64'	Stadium: The Valley; Attendance: 26,614; Referee: Jeff Winter

=== FA Cup ===
3	Southampton	0–3	Newcastle United	Southampton, Hampshire
GMT (UTC)				Stadium: St Mary's Stadium

=== League Cup ===
- Third round: Bristol City 1–3 Southampton; attendance 17,408

2 December 2003 4	Southampton	2–0	Portsmouth	Southampton, Hampshire
GMT (UTC)	Beattie 33', 90' (pen.)	Report	De Zeeuw (red card) 90'	Stadium: St Mary's Stadium; Attendance: 29,201; Referee: Graham Poll

16 December 2003 5	Bolton Wanderers	1–0	Southampton	Bolton, Greater Manchester
GMT (UTC)	Pedersen 115'	Report		Stadium: Reebok Stadium; Attendance: 13,957; Referee: Phil Dowd

=== UEFA Cup ===
24 September 2003 First Round; First Leg	Southampton (England)	1–1	(Romania) Steaua București	St Mary's Stadium, Southampton
19:45 BST	Phillips 52'	Report	Răducanu 20'	Attendance: 30,577; Referee: Tommy Skjerven (Norway)

15 October 2003 First Round; Second Leg	Steaua București (Romania)	1–0 (2–1 agg.)	(England) Southampton	Stadionul Steaua, Bucharest
18:45 EEST	Răducanu 83'	Report		Attendance: 25,000; Referee: Stefan Johannesson (Sweden)

== Statistics ==
=== Appearances and goals ===
No.	Pos	Nat	Player	Total		Premier League		FA Cup		League Cup		UEFA Cup	
No.	Pos	Nat	Player	Apps	Goals	Apps	Goals	Apps	Goals	Apps	Goals	Apps	Goals
Goalkeepers
14	GK	(Finland) FIN	Antti Niemi	33	0	28	0	1	0	3	0	1	0
28	GK	(Northern Ireland) NIR	Alan Blayney	2	0	2	0	0	0	0	0	0	0
Defenders
2	DF	(England) ENG	Jason Dodd	34	0	27+1	0	1	0	3	0	2	0
3	DF	(England) ENG	Graeme Le Saux	21	1	19	0	0	0	1	1	1	0
5	DF	(Norway) NOR	Claus Lundekvam	36	1	31	1	1	0	2	0	2	0
6	DF	(Scotland) SCO	Stephen Crainey	5	0	5	0	0	0	0	0	0	0
11	DF	(Sweden) SWE	Michael Svensson	32	2	26	2	1	0	3	0	2	0
15	DF	(England) ENG	Fitz Hall	12	0	7+4	0	0	0	1	0	0	0
16	DF	(England) ENG	Martin Cranie	1	0	1	0	0	0	0	0	0	0
19	DF	(England) ENG	Danny Higginbotham	31	0	24+3	0	1	0	2	0	1	0
22	DF	(England) ENG	Darren Kenton	7	0	3+4	0	0	0	0	0	0	0
32	DF	(Northern Ireland) NIR	Chris Baird	4	0	1+3	0	0	0	0	0	0	0
Midfielders
8	MF	(England) ENG	Matt Oakley	8	0	7	0	0	0	0	0	1	0
10	MF	(Scotland) SCO	Neil McCann	21	0	9+9	0	0	0	0+2	0	0+1	0
12	MF	(Sweden) SWE	Anders Svensson	34	0	17+13	0	1	0	1	0	2	0
18	MF	(Republic of Ireland) IRL	Rory Delap	32	1	26+1	1	0	0	3	0	1+1	0
20	MF	(England) ENG	David Prutton	30	1	22+5	1	1	0	1+1	0	0	0
21	MF	(Norway) NOR	Jo Tessem	3	0	1+2	0	0	0	0	0	0	0
29	MF	(France) FRA	Fabrice Fernandes	31	1	21+6	1	0	0	2	0	2	0
30	MF	(France) FRA	Léandre Griffit	5	2	2+3	2	0	0	0	0	0	0
31	MF	(France) FRA	Yoann Folly	9	0	9	0	0	0	0	0	0	0
33	MF	(Scotland) SCO	Paul Telfer	43	0	33+4	0	1	0	2+1	0	1+1	0
Forwards
7	FW	(England) ENG	Kevin Phillips	37	13	28+6	12	1	0	0	0	2	1
9	FW	(England) ENG	James Beattie	42	17	32+5	14	1	0	2	3	2	0
17	FW	(Latvia) LAT	Marian Pahars	16	2	6+8	2	1	0	1	0	0	0
34	FW	(Ecuador) ECU	Agustin Delgado	6	0	0+4	0	0	0	1+1	0	0	0
36	FW	(England) ENG	Brett Ormerod	26	6	14+8	5	0+1	0	3	1	0	0
Players transferred out during the season
1	GK	(Wales) WAL	Paul Jones	10	0	8	0	0	0	0+1	0	1	0
4	MF	(England) ENG	Chris Marsden	17	0	9+4	0	0	0	2+1	0	1	0
