= Southampton F.C. Player of the Season =

English football club award

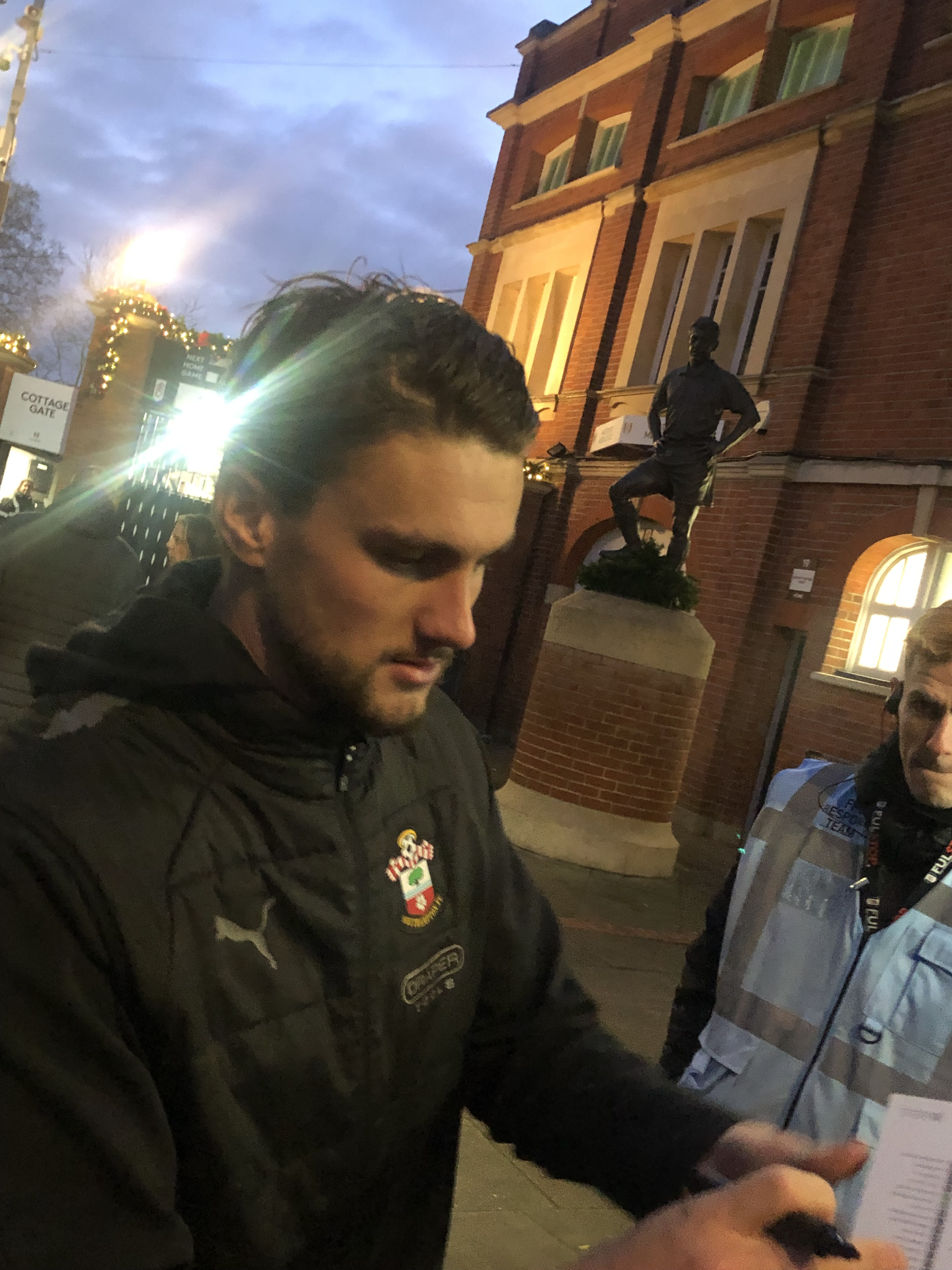
Taylor Harwood-Bellis won the Southern Daily Echo Player of the Season award for the 2025–26 season.

Southampton Football Club is an English association football club based in Southampton, Hampshire. Founded in 1885 as St Mary's YMA, they became a professional club in 1891, and co-founded the Southern League in 1894. Southampton won the Southern League championship six times between 1896 and 1904, and were later elected to the Football League in 1920 as co-founders of the Third Division. The Saints finished as runners-up in their first season, and the following year received promotion to the Second Division as Third Division South champions. The club first entered the First Division in 1966, and currently play in its modern-day counterpart, the Premier League. Southampton won the FA Cup in 1976, reached the final of the League Cup in 1979 and 2017, and won the League Trophy in 2010.

The Southampton Player of the Season award is voted for annually by the club's supporters, who send their choice of player to the Southern Daily Echo, a local newspaper. Since its inception in 1973, 44 different players have won the award. Six of these players have received the accolade for a second time, and to date only Matt Le Tissier has won the award for a third time. Four players have won in consecutive seasons, 32 winners have represented their country at international level, and one winner (Alan Ball) has gone on to become the club's manager. The most recent winner of the award, for the 2025–26 season, is defender Taylor Harwood-Bellis.

In recent years, the club has also presented its own Player of the Season award, alongside other end-of-season accolades. The most recent winner of the club-run Fans' Player of the Season award is Léo Scienza.

== Table key ==
^{¤}	Denotes divisional change due to promotion or relegation
*	Denotes player who is currently playing for the club
^{†}	Denotes player who has won full international caps

Div 1	First Division (1973–1992), Premier League (1992–)
Div 2	Second Division (1973–1992), First Division (1992–2004), Championship (2004–)
Div 3	Third Division (1973–1992), Second Division (1992–2004), League One (2004–)

== Winners ==
As of 26 May 2026

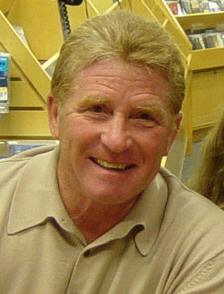
1978 winner Alan Ball is the only player to have won the award and gone on to manage the club (from 1994 to 1995).

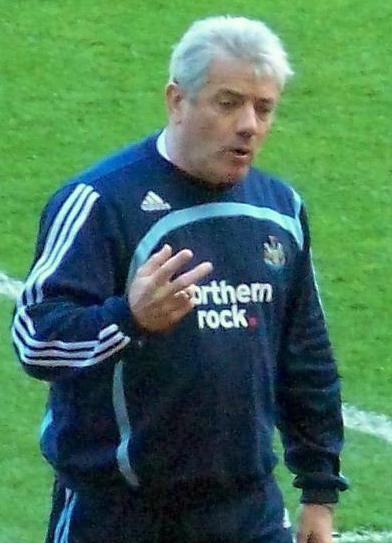
Kevin Keegan won the award in 1981–82, the same year he won the PFA Players' Player of the Year award.

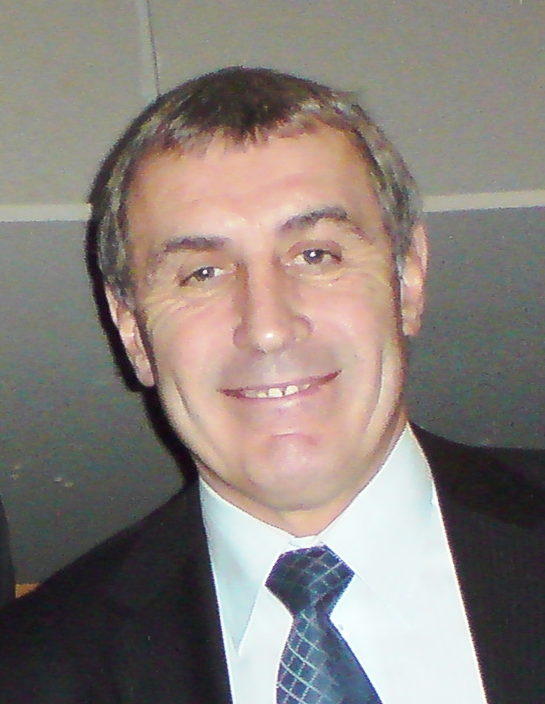
Peter Shilton was the first goalkeeper to win the award, the first player to win it twice, and the first player to win it in two consecutive seasons.

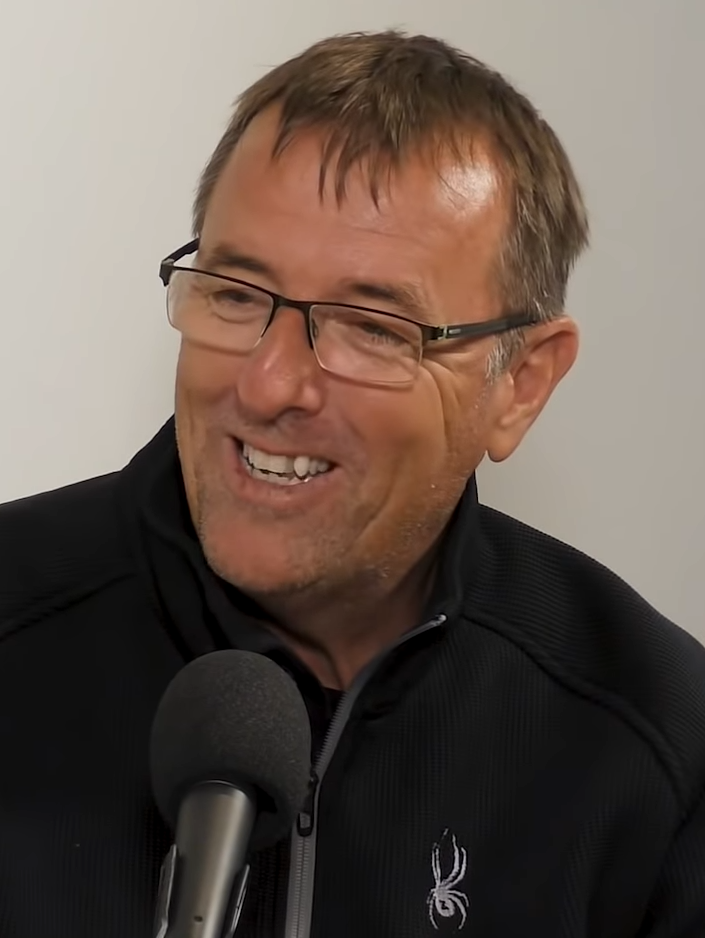
To date, Matt Le Tissier is the only player to receive the accolade on three occasions (in 1990, 1994 and 1995).

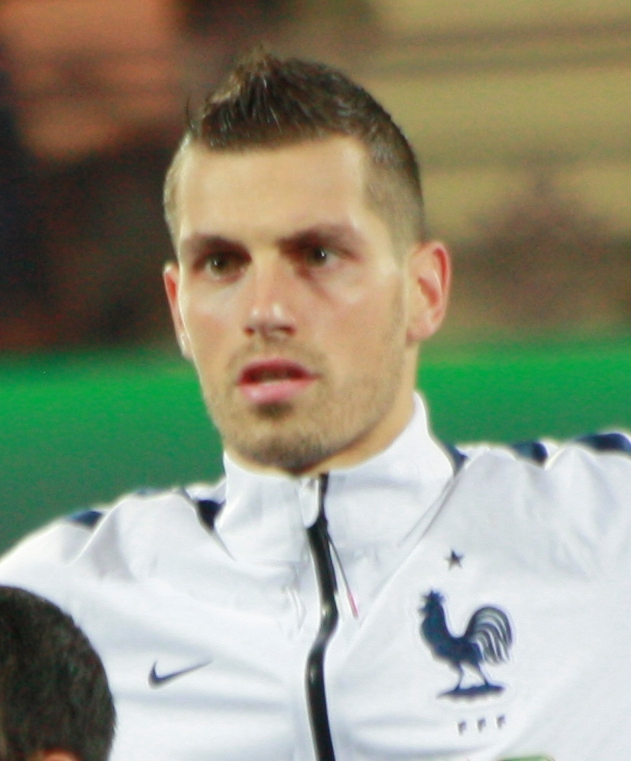
Morgan Schneiderlin was the inaugural winner of the Southampton F.C. award.

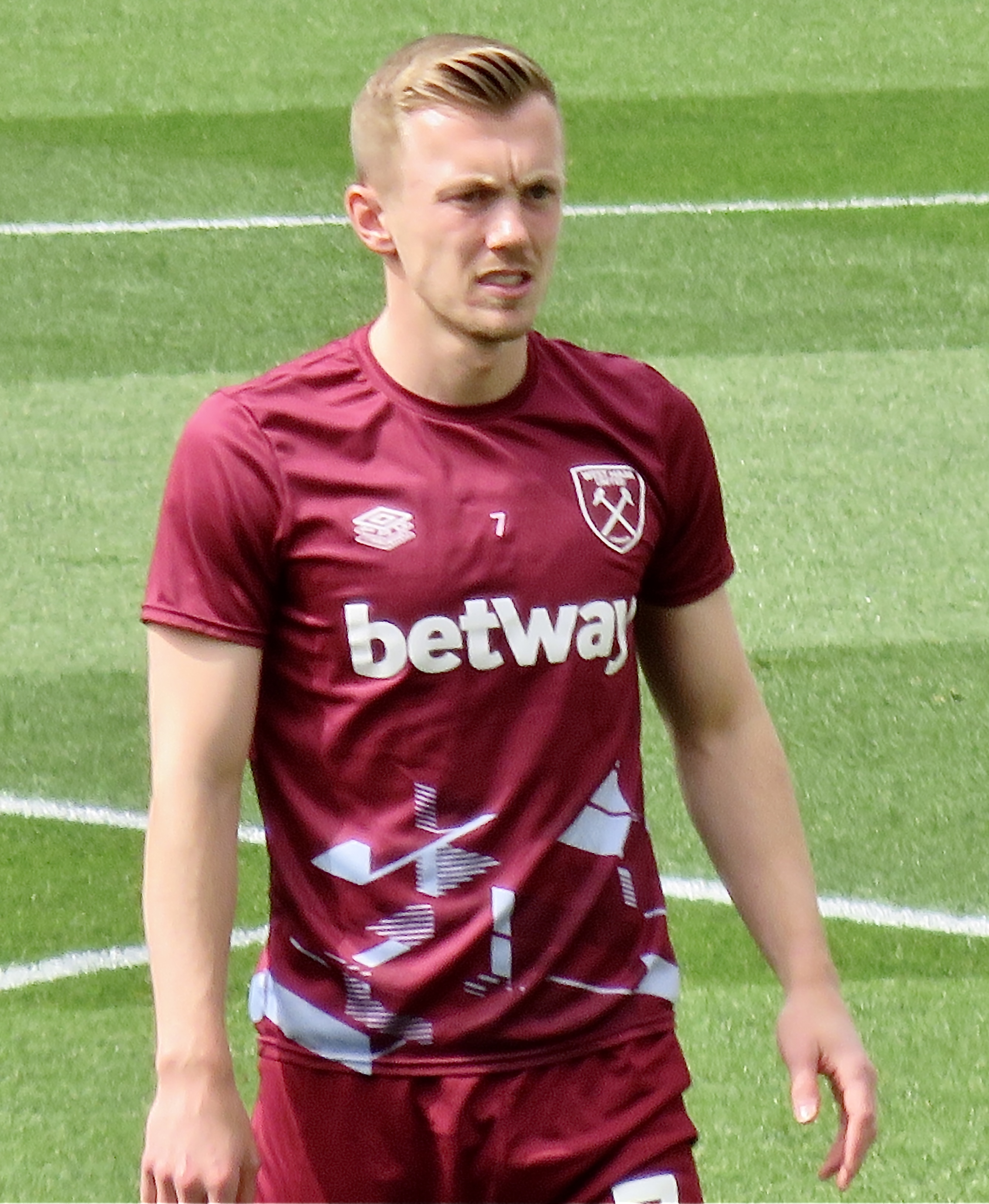
James Ward-Prowse won both the Southampton F.C. award and Southern Daily Echo award in two consecutive seasons.

=== Southern Daily Echo award ===
Season	Level (Note: The official level of competition in the structure of the English football league system.)	Player	Position (Note: For a detailed description of playing positions, see association football positions.)	Nationality	Apps	Goals	Caps	Notes
1973–74	Div 1	Mick Channon	Forward	England	607	228	46^{†}	(Note: The inaugural winner of the award.)
1974–75	Div 2^{¤}	Mel Blyth	Defender	England	136	7	0	—
1975–76	Div 2	David Peach	Defender	England	282	44	0	(Note: Received eight caps for the England under-21 team.)
1976–77	Div 2	Steve Williams	Midfielder	England	349	27	6^{†}	—
1977–78	Div 2	Alan Ball	Midfielder	England	234	13	72^{†}	(Note: Went on to manage the club between 1994 and 1995.)
1978–79	Div 1^{¤}	Malcolm Waldron	Defender	England	218	11	0	(Note: Received one cap for the England B team.)
1979–80	Div 1	Phil Boyer	Forward	England	162	61	1^{†}	—
1980–81	Div 1	Ivan Golac	Defender	Yugoslavia	197	4	1^{†}	(Note: The first non-English and non-British winner of the award.)
1981–82	Div 1	Kevin Keegan	Forward	England	80	42	63^{†}	—
1982–83	Div 1	Mark Wright	Defender	England	222	11	45^{†}	—
1983–84	Div 1	David Armstrong	Midfielder	England	272	71	3^{†}	—
1984–85	Div 1	Peter Shilton	Goalkeeper	England	242	0	125^{†}	—
1985–86	Div 1	Peter Shilton (2)	Goalkeeper	England	242	0	125^{†}	(Note: The first player to win the award twice, and in consecutive seasons.) (Note: Won the award on two occasions.)
1986–87	Div 1	Glenn Cockerill	Midfielder	England	358	39	0	—
1987–88	Div 1	Derek Statham	Defender	England	78	4	3^{†}	—
1988–89	Div 1	Jimmy Case	Midfielder	England	272	14	0	(Note: Received one cap for the England under-23 team.)
1989–90	Div 1	Matt Le Tissier	Midfielder	England	540	210	8^{†}	—
1990–91	Div 1	Alan Shearer	Forward	England	158	43	63^{†}	—
1991–92	Div 1	Tim Flowers	Goalkeeper	England	251	0	11^{†}	—
1992–93	Div 1	Tim Flowers (2)	Goalkeeper	England	251	0	11^{†}	
1993–94	Div 1	Matt Le Tissier (2)	Midfielder	England	540	210	8^{†}	
1994–95	Div 1	Matt Le Tissier (3)	Midfielder	England	540	210	8^{†}	(Note: The first player to win the award three times.)
1995–96	Div 1	Dave Beasant	Goalkeeper	England	105	0	2^{†}	—
1996–97	Div 1	Egil Østenstad	Forward	Norway	109	33	18^{†}	—
1997–98	Div 1	Paul Jones	Goalkeeper	Wales	223	0	50^{†}	—
1998–99	Div 1	James Beattie	Forward	England	235	76	5^{†}	—
1999–2000	Div 1	Dean Richards	Defender	England	79	7	0	(Note: Received four caps for the England under-21 team.)
2000–01	Div 1	Wayne Bridge	Defender	England	174	2	36^{†}	—
2001–02	Div 1	Chris Marsden	Midfielder	England	152	8	0	—
2002–03	Div 1	James Beattie (2)	Forward	England	235	76	5^{†}	
2003–04	Div 1	Antti Niemi	Goalkeeper	Finland	123	0	67^{†}	—
2004–05	Div 1	Peter Crouch	Forward	England	33	16	42^{†}	—
2005–06	Div 2^{¤}	Claus Lundekvam	Defender	Norway	413	2	40^{†}	—
2006–07	Div 2	Chris Baird	Defender	Northern Ireland	79	3	79^{†}	—
2007–08	Div 2	Andrew Davies	Defender	England	25	0	0	(Note: Received one cap for the England under-21 team.)
2008–09	Div 2	Kelvin Davis	Goalkeeper	England	301	0	0	—
2009–10	Div 3^{¤}	Rickie Lambert	Forward	England	235	117	11^{†}	—
2010–11	Div 3	José Fonte	Defender	Portugal	288	15	50^{†}	—
2011–12	Div 2^{¤}	Rickie Lambert (2)	Forward	England	235	117	11^{†}	
2012–13	Div 1^{¤}	Morgan Schneiderlin	Midfielder	France	261	15	15^{†}	—
2013–14	Div 1	Adam Lallana	Midfielder	England	283	60	34^{†}	—
2014–15	Div 1	José Fonte (2)	Defender	Portugal	288	15	50^{†}	
2015–16	Div 1	Shane Long	Forward	Republic of Ireland	245	36	88^{†}	—
2016–17	Div 1	Oriol Romeu	Midfielder	Spain	263	9	0	(Note: Received five caps for the Spain under-23 team.)
2017–18	Div 1	Alex McCarthy	Goalkeeper	England	165	0	1^{†}	—
2018–19	Div 1	Nathan Redmond	Midfielder	England	232	30	1^{†}	—
2019–20	Div 1	Danny Ings	Forward	England	100	46	3^{†}	—
2020–21	Div 1	James Ward-Prowse	Midfielder	England	410	55	11^{†}	—
2021–22	Div 1	James Ward-Prowse (2)	Midfielder	England	410	55	11^{†}	
2022–23	Div 1	Roméo Lavia	Midfielder	Belgium	34	1	1^{†}	—
2023–24	Div 2^{¤}	Flynn Downes^{*}	Midfielder	England	109	6	0	(Note: Received six caps for the England under-20 team.)
2024–25	Div 1^{¤}	Mateus Fernandes	Midfielder	Portugal	46	4	1^{†}	—
2025–26	Div 2^{¤}	Taylor Harwood-Bellis^{*}	Defender	England	132	12	1^{†}	—

=== Southampton F.C. award ===
Season	Level	Player	Position	Nationality	Apps	Goals	Caps	Notes
2012–13	Div 1^{¤}	Morgan Schneiderlin	Midfielder	France	261	15	15^{†}	—
2013–14	Div 1	Adam Lallana	Midfielder	England	283	60	34^{†}	—
2014–15	Div 1	José Fonte	Defender	Portugal	288	15	50^{†}	—
2015–16	Div 1	Virgil van Dijk	Defender	Netherlands	80	7	90^{†}	—
2016–17	Div 1	Oriol Romeu	Midfielder	Spain	263	9	0	
2017–18	Div 1	Alex McCarthy	Goalkeeper	England	165	0	1^{†}	—
2018–19	Div 1	Nathan Redmond	Midfielder	England	232	30	1^{†}	—
2019–20	Div 1	Danny Ings	Forward	England	100	46	3^{†}	—
2020–21	Div 1	James Ward-Prowse	Midfielder	England	410	55	11^{†}	—
2021–22	Div 1	James Ward-Prowse (2)	Midfielder	England	410	55	11^{†}	—
2022–23	Div 1	Not awarded						
2023–24	Div 2^{¤}	Adam Armstrong	Forward	England	174	43	0	(Note: Received five caps for the England under-21 team.)
2024–25	Div 1^{¤}	Mateus Fernandes	Midfielder	Portugal	46	4	1^{†}	—
2025–26	Div 2^{¤}	Léo Scienza^{*}	Midfielder	Brazil	44	7	0	—

== Bibliography ==
- Chalk, Gary; Holley, Duncan (1987), Saints: A Complete Record of Southampton Football Club 1885–1987, Breedon Books, ISBN 0-907969-22-4
- Chalk, Gary; Holley, Duncan (2003), In That Number: A Post-War Chronicle of Southampton FC, Hagiology Publishing, ISBN 0-953447-43-X
- Illingsworth, Nick (2007), Saints Preserved: An A-Z of Southampton Football Club, Elephant Books, ISBN 978-0-9552642-1-4
