= Claus Lundekvam =

Norwegian footballer (born 1973)

Personal information
- Full name: Claus Lundekvam
- Date of birth: 22 February 1973 (age 53)
- Place of birth: Austevoll Municipality, Norway
- Height: 1.91 m (6 ft 3 in)
- Position: Centre-back

Youth career
- Selbjørn
- Brann

Senior career*
Years	Team	Apps	(Gls)
1993–1996	Brann	54	(0)
1996–2008	Southampton	357	(2)
Total		410	(2)

International career
1994–1995	Norway U21	16	(0)
1995–2005	Norway	40	(2)
- * Club domestic league appearances and goals

Claus Lundekvam (born 22 February 1973) is a Norwegian former professional footballer who played as a centre-back. Lundekvam began his career with Brann before moving to English side Southampton in 1996 where he played until his retirement in 2008. He made a total of 413 appearances for the club, of which 290 were in the Premier League, and was the team's captain for several years. He notably played for Southampton in the 2003 FA Cup Final against Arsenal. Lundekvam was capped 40 times for Norway and often captained the national team.

== Playing career ==
Lundekvam was a junior player for local team Selbjørn in Austevoll Municipality before joining Norwegian top flight team Brann, where he made his senior debut in 1993. He eventually earned a starting place in the team at centre-back and participated in Brann's UEFA Cup Winners' Cup campaign, before being sold to English side Southampton in July 1996.

Lundekvam made his Premiership debut against Nottingham Forest on 4 September and would go on to captain Southampton for several years. He scored his first goal in the Premiership against Wolverhampton Wanderers on 3 April 2004, and his second goal against Cardiff on 1 April 2006, in the Championship. Coincidentally, both teams were managed at the time by former Saints manager Dave Jones.

In 2002–03, he contributed to one of Southampton's most successful seasons in history as they finished eighth in the Premiership and reached the FA Cup final, where they lost 1–0 to Arsenal. The team was managed by Gordon Strachan, who famously joked when Lundekvam was stretchered off injured in a game against Leicester City in the 2003–04 season that he "didn't have a clue" whether the player was unconscious as "that's what he's always like".

Lundekvam remained at Southampton after their relegation from the Premier League in 2005. He went off injured after five minutes of the first game of the 2006–07 season, away to Derby County on 6 August 2006, and missed the first two months of the season. He then had a long run in the team before another injury in March put him out for another month. In a game at St Mary's against Southend United on 6 May 2007, Lundekvam fell awkwardly and sustained a serious ankle injury that put him out of action. On 18 March 2008, it was announced that his injury was to the extent that his playing career was over. Southampton rewarded Lundekvam for his service to the club that had included over 400 appearances with a testimonial match against Celtic, managed by Gordon Strachan, at St Mary's on 18 July 2008. Curiously, Lundekvam had to pay the expenses of his own testimonial match, due to the St Mary's pitch being damaged following a Bon Jovi concert the week before, but the fan turnout allowed him to recoup his budget.

== International career ==
Lundekvam made his international debut for the Norwegian U21 team in 1994 and his senior debut for the Norwegian national team in November 1995. His first international goal, against Bosnia-Herzegovina in 2002, was the 1,000th goal in the history of the Norwegian national team. Lundekvam was capped 40 times for the national team, often as captain, and scored two goals.

== Later career ==
Following his retirement, Lundekvam continued residing in Southampton before returning to Norway with his family. Lundekvam would later reveal that he had problems with depression, drugs and alcohol after his playing career. About his addiction he said: "I would drink two litres of hard liquor and do between five and ten grams of cocaine every day." Lundekvam got help to overcome his addiction and issues at Sporting Chance Clinic, a recovery facility for athletes set up by former Arsenal captain Tony Adams.

In July 2012, Lundekvam claimed that he, team-mates and opposing captains were involved in betting fraud during their playing days, stating that: "We could make deals with the opposing captain about, for example, betting on the first throw, the first corner, who started with the ball, a yellow card or a penalty. Those were the sorts of thing we had influence over." The allegations were later denied by Lundekvam's former team-mate and captain Francis Benali. In 2015, he released his autobiography detailing his career and struggles with addiction and mental health. Lundekvam worked regularly as a pundit for TV 2, the largest commercial broadcaster in Norway, until 2016. Lundekvam now works with the Psychiatry Alliance in Bergen to help others with mental health and drug issues by sharing his own experiences.

== Career statistics ==
=== Club ===
Appearances and goals by club, season and competition
Club	Season	League			National Cup		League Cup		Europe		Total	
Club	Season	Division	Apps	Goals	Apps	Goals	Apps	Goals	Apps	Goals	Apps	Goals
Brann	1993	Tippeligaen	3	0	0	0	0	0	0	0	3	0
Brann	1994	Tippeligaen	21	0	4	0	—		0	0	25	0
Brann	1995	Tippeligaen	14	0	7	0	—		0	0	21	0
Brann	1996	Tippeligaen	16	0	4	2	—		2 (Note: Appearances in UEFA Cup Winners' Cup)	0	22	2
Brann	Total		54	0	15	2	0	0	2	0	71	2
Southampton	1996–97	Premier League	29	0	1	0	8	0	—		38	0
Southampton	1997–98	Premier League	31	0	0	0	4	0	—		35	0
Southampton	1998–99	Premier League	33	0	2	0	2	0	—		37	0
Southampton	1999–2000	Premier League	27	0	2	0	4	0	—		33	0
Southampton	2000–01	Premier League	38	0	4	0	3	0	—		45	0
Southampton	2001–02	Premier League	34	0	1	0	2	0	—		37	0
Southampton	2002–03	Premier League	33	0	6	0	2	0	—		41	0
Southampton	2003–04	Premier League	31	1	1	0	2	0	2 (Note: Appearances in UEFA Europa League)	0	36	1
Southampton	2004–05	Premier League	34	0	4	0	3	0	—		41	0
Southampton	2005–06	Championship	34	1	3	0	0	0	—		37	1
Southampton	2006–07	Championship	33	0	0	0	0	0	—		33	0
Southampton	Total		357	2	24	0	30	0	2	0	413	2
Career total			411	2	39	2	30	0	4	0	484	4

=== International ===
Appearances and goals by national team and year
National team	Year	Apps	Goals
Norway	1995	2	0
Norway	1996	2	0
Norway	1998	1	0
Norway	1999	2	0
Norway	2000	1	0
Norway	2001	3	0
Norway	2002	5	1
Norway	2003	9	0
Norway	2004	9	0
Norway	2005	6	1
Total		40	2

Scores and results list Norway's goal tally first, score column indicates score after each Lundekvam goal.

List of international goals scored by Claus Lundekvam
No.	Date	Venue	Opponent	Score	Result	Competition	Ref.
1	16 October 2002	Ullevaal Stadion, Oslo, Norway	Bosnia and Herzegovina	1–0	2–0	UEFA Euro 2004 qualifying	
2	3 September 2005	Arena Petrol, Celje, Slovenia	Slovenia	2–1	3–2	2006 FIFA World Cup qualification	

== Honours ==
Brann

- Norwegian Football Cup runner-up: 1995

Southampton

- FA Cup runner-up: 2002–03

Individual

- Southampton Player of the Season: 2005–06
