= 2005–06 Southampton F.C. season =

Southampton
2005–06 season
- Chairman: Rupert Lowe
- Manager: Harry Redknapp (until 3 December); George Burley (from 23 December)
- Stadium: St Mary's
- Championship: 12th
- FA Cup: Fifth round
- League Cup: Second round
- Top goalscorer: League: Ricardo Fuller (9); All: Ricardo Fuller (9)
- Highest home attendance: 30,173 (vs. Leeds United, 19 November)
- Lowest home attendance: 19,086 (vs. Luton Town, 11 December)
- Average home league attendance: 23,613

During the 2005–06 English football season, Southampton Football Club competed in the Football League Championship after relegation from the premier league the previous season. It was their first season in the second tier since 1977–78.

Southampton endured a poor to largely indifferent season after relegation from the Premier League the previous season and finished in a lowly 12th place in the Championship. Although the south coast side started the season well, they ended up drawing too many games (19 games by the season's end) and a run of five wins from 35 games dragged them into the lower reaches of the table and put Southampton in danger of a second successive relegation. Manager Harry Redknapp, unable to establish consistency and unhappy with the appointment of former rugby coach Sir Clive Woodward to the coaching staff, had resigned in December, returning as manager of Southampton's archrivals Portsmouth. His replacement, former Ipswich Town manager George Burley, was unable to turn the club's form around until the back end of the season, with five wins from their last six games taking the team from 20th to 12th. The late run of form gave fans hope that next season Southampton could mount a sustained attempt at promotion.

== Kit ==
The season's kit was manufactured by the club's own brand, Saints. The kit was sponsored by English life insurance company Friends Provident.

== Final league table ==
Pos	Team	Pld	W	D	L	GF	GA	GD	Pts
10	Luton Town	46	17	10	19	66	67	−1	61
11	Cardiff City	46	16	12	18	58	59	−1	60
12	Southampton	46	13	19	14	49	50	−1	58
13	Stoke City	46	17	7	22	54	63	−9	58
14	Plymouth Argyle	46	13	17	16	39	46	−7	56

Updated to match(es) played on 2 December 2011. Source: RSSSF
Rules for classification: 1) points; 2) goal difference; 3) number of goals scored.

== Results ==
Southampton's score comes first

=== Legend ===
Win	Draw	Loss

=== Championship ===
Date	Opponent	Venue	Result	Attendance	Scorers
6 August 2005	Wolverhampton Wanderers	H	0–0	24,061	
9 August 2005	Luton Town	A	2–3	9,447	Oakley, Jones
13 August 2005	Sheffield Wednesday	A	1–0	26,688	Jones
20 August 2005	Norwich City	H	1–0	23,498	Quashie (pen)
27 August 2005	Crewe Alexandra	H	2–0	20,792	Belmadi, Quashie
29 August 2005	Coventry City	A	1–1	23,000	Fuller
10 September 2005	Queens Park Rangers	H	1–1	25,744	Higginbotham
13 September 2005	Ipswich Town	A	2–2	22,997	Powell, Wise
18 September 2005	Derby County	A	2–2	22,348	Ormerod, Fuller
24 September 2005	Plymouth Argyle	H	0–0	26,331	
28 September 2005	Reading	H	0–0	24,946	
1 October 2005	Preston North End	A	1–1	15,263	Davidson (own goal)
15 October 2005	Hull City	H	1–1	23,810	Oakley
18 October 2005	Leeds United	A	1–2	18,881	Walcott
22 October 2005	Millwall	A	2–0	10,759	Walcott, Fuller
29 October 2005	Stoke City	H	2–0	24,095	Walcott, Belmadi
5 November 2005	Leicester City	A	0–0	21,318	
19 November 2005	Leeds United	H	3–4	30,173	Pahars, Quashie (2, 1 pen)
22 November 2005	Hull City	A	1–1	18,061	Kosowski
26 November 2005	Wolverhampton Wanderers	A	0–0	24,628	
3 December 2005	Burnley	H	1–1	21,592	Higginbotham (pen)
11 December 2005	Luton Town	H	1–0	19,086	Walcott
17 December 2005	Norwich City	A	1–3	24,836	Belmadi
26 December 2005	Watford	A	0–3	16,972	
28 December 2005	Sheffield United	H	0–1	27,443	
31 December 2005	Cardiff City	A	1–2	13,377	Blackstock
2 January 2006	Brighton & Hove Albion	H	2–1	24,630	Blackstock (2)
14 January 2006	Queens Park Rangers	A	0–1	15,494	
21 January 2006	Ipswich Town	H	0–2	22,250	
25 January 2006	Crystal Palace	H	0–0	24,651	
31 January 2006	Plymouth Argyle	A	1–2	15,936	Surman
4 February 2006	Derby County	H	0–0	21,829	
10 February 2006	Reading	A	0–2	23,845	
15 February 2006	Preston North End	H	0–0	19,534	
25 February 2006	Sheffield Wednesday	H	3–0	26,236	Higginbotham, Rasiak, Jones
4 March 2006	Coventry City	H	1–1	21,980	Rasiak
11 March 2006	Crewe Alexandra	A	1–1	6,588	Madsen
20 March 2006	Watford	H	1–3	19,202	Madsen
25 March 2006	Sheffield United	A	0–3	22,824	
28 March 2006	Burnley	A	1–1	10,636	Bardsley (own goal)
1 April 2006	Cardiff City	H	3–2	22,388	Lundekvam, Fuller (2)
8 April 2006	Brighton & Hove Albion	A	2–0	7,999	Fuller, Chaplow
15 April 2006	Stoke City	A	2–1	16,501	Rasiak (2, 1 pen)
17 April 2006	Millwall	H	2–0	22,043	Jones (pen), Fuller
22 April 2006	Crystal Palace	A	1–2	20,995	Fuller
30 April 2006	Leicester City	H	2–0	26,801	Fuller, Surman

=== FA Cup ===
Round	Date	Opponent	Venue	Result	Attendance	Goalscorers
R3	7 January 2006	Milton Keynes Dons	H	4–3	15,908	Prutton, Quashie, Walcott, Kenton
R4	28 January 2006	Leicester City	A	1–0	20,427	Jones
R5	18 February 2006	Newcastle United	A	0–1	40,975	

=== League Cup ===
Round	Date	Opponent	Venue	Result	Attendance	Goalscorers
R1	22 August 2005	Southend United	A	3–0	6,358	Blackstock, Dyer, Ormerod
R2	20 September 2005	Mansfield Town	A	0–1	3,739	

== First-team squad ==
Squad at end of season Note: Flags indicate national team as defined under FIFA eligibility rules; some limited exceptions apply. Players may hold more than one non-FIFA nationality.

No.	Pos.	Nation	Player
2	DF	SWE	Alexander Östlund
3	MF	POL	Kamil Kosowski (on loan from Wisła Kraków)
4	MF	ENG	Darren Potter (on loan from Liverpool)
5	DF	NOR	Claus Lundekvam
6	DF	ENG	Darren Powell
8	MF	ENG	Matt Oakley
10	MF	ENG	Jermaine Wright (on loan from Leeds United)
11	DF	SWE	Michael Svensson
13	GK	ENG	Paul Smith
14	FW	JAM	Ricardo Fuller
15	FW	TTO	Kenwyne Jones
16	DF	ENG	Martin Cranie
17	FW	LAT	Marian Pahars
18	FW	POL	Grzegorz Rasiak (on loan from Tottenham Hotspur)

No.	Pos.	Nation	Player
19	DF	ENG	Danny Higginbotham
20	MF	ENG	David Prutton
21	DF	NIR	Chris Baird
22	DF	ENG	Darren Kenton
24	FW	ENG	Dexter Blackstock
26	GK	ENG	Kevin Miller
28	GK	POL	Bartosz Białkowski
29	MF	ENG	Andrew Surman
31	MF	ALG	Djamel Belmadi
33	FW	ENG	Nathan Dyer
34	DF	CAN	Jim Brennan
35	FW	IRL	David McGoldrick
36	MF	ENG	Simon Gillett
37	DF	WAL	Gareth Bale

=== Left club during season ===
Note: Flags indicate national team as defined under FIFA eligibility rules; some limited exceptions apply. Players may hold more than one non-FIFA nationality.

No.	Pos.	Nation	Player
1	GK	FIN	Antti Niemi (to Fulham)
4	MF	ENG	Dennis Wise (to Coventry City)
7	DF	POL	Tomasz Hajto (to Derby County)
9	FW	ENG	Brett Ormerod (to Preston North End)
9	FW	DEN	Peter Madsen (on loan from Cologne)
10	MF	SCO	Neil McCann (to Hearts)
12	MF	SCO	Nigel Quashie (to West Bromwich Albion)
12	MF	ENG	Richard Chaplow (on loan from West Bromwich Albion)
18	MF	IRL	Rory Delap (to Sunderland)

No.	Pos.	Nation	Player
23	MF	FRA	Yoann Folly (on loan to Sheffield Wednesday)
26	DF	ENG	Matthew Mills (to Manchester City)
27	FW	IRL	Leon Best (on loan to Sheffield Wednesday)
28	GK	NIR	Alan Blayney (to Doncaster Rovers)
29	MF	FRA	Fabrice Fernandes (to Bolton Wanderers)
29	MF	FRA	Léandre Griffit (to Elfsborg)
32	FW	ENG	Theo Walcott (to Arsenal)
34	FW	URU	Marcelo Tejera (to Peñarol)
37	GK	SCO	Andrew McNeil (to Hibernian)

== Reserve squad ==
Note: Flags indicate national team as defined under FIFA eligibility rules; some limited exceptions apply. Players may hold more than one non-FIFA nationality.

No.	Pos.	Nation	Player
25	GK	ENG	Danny Brice
40	MF	SWE	Joseph Larrson
42	DF	HUN	Yirhan Zolvavcs

== Transfers in ==
Date	Position	Player	Club From	Fee	Reference
27 June 2005	MF	Dennis Wise	Millwall	Free	
	MF	Djamel Belmadi	Al-Kharitiyath		
1 July 2005	DF	Darren Powell	Crystal Palace	Free	
29 July 2005	FW	Ricardo Fuller	Portsmouth	£90,000	
29 July 2005	DF	Tomasz Hajto	Nurnberg	Free	
6 January 2006	GK	Bartosz Białkowski	Górnik Zabrze	Nominal	
26 January 2006	MF	Darren Potter	Liverpool	Loan	
27 January 2006	DF	Jim Brennan	Norwich CIty	Free	
30 January 2006	DF	Alexander Östlund	Feyenoord	Undisclosed	
30 January 2006	FW	Peter Madsen	1. FC Koln	Loan	
8 February 2006	MF	Richard Chaplow	West Bromwich Albion	Three-month Loan	
8 February 2006	FW	Grzegorz Rasiak	Tottenham Hotspur	Loan	
8 February 2006	MF	Jermaine Wright	Leeds United	Loan	
	GK	Kevin Miller	Bristol Rovers	Free	
	MF	Kamil Kosowski	Wisla Krakow	Loan	

== Transfers out ==
Date	Position	Player	Club To	Fee	Reference
	DF	Graeme Le Saux	None	Retirement	
	DF	Jamie Redknapp	None	Retirement	
29 June 2005	FW	Kevin Phillips	Aston Villa	£1,000,000	
30 June 2005	DF	Jelle Van Damme	Werder Bremen	Loan	
1 July 2005	FW	Jo Tessem	Lyn	Free	
19 July 2005	DF	Andreas Jakobsson	Helsingborg	Undisclosed	
20 July 2005	FW	Peter Crouch	Liverpool	£7,000,000	
22 July 2005	DF	Paul Telfer	Celtic	Free	
1 August 2005	MF	Mikael Nilsson	Panathinaikos	€700,000	
31 August 2005	MF	Fabrice Fernandes	Bolton Wanderers	Free	
1 September 2005	DF	Olivier Bernard	Rangers	Free	
	DF	Tomasz Hajto	Derby County		
7 January 2006	GK	Alan Blayney	Doncaster Rovers	£50,000	
10 January 2006	GK	Antti Niemi	Fulham	£1,000,000	
17 January 2006	MF	Neil McCann	Hearts	Free	
19 January 2006	MF	Dennis Wise	Coventry City	Free	
20 January 2006	FW	Theo Walcott	Arsenal	£5,000.000	
28 January 2006	FW	Brett Ormerod	Preston North End	Free	
31 January 2006	MF	Rory Delap	Sunderland	Free	
31 January 2006	DF	Matthew Mills	Manchester CIty	Undisclosed	
31 January 2006	FW	Leon Best	Sheffield Wednesday	Loan	
31 January 2006	MF	Yoann Folly	Sheffield Wednesday	Loan	
1 February 2006	MF	Nigel Quashie	West Bromwich Albion	£1,400,000	
2 March 2006	MF	Leandre Griffit	Elfsborg	Free	
