= 1997–98 Southampton F.C. season =

Southampton F.C.
1997–98 season
- Chairman: Rupert Lowe
- Manager: Dave Jones
- Stadium: The Dell
- FA Premier League: 12th
- FA Cup: Third round
- League Cup: Fourth round
- Top goalscorer: League: Matt Le Tissier (11); Egil Østenstad (11); All: Matt Le Tissier (14)
- Highest home attendance: 15,255 v Tottenham; Hotspur (25 October 1997)
- Lowest home attendance: 8,004 v Brentford (17 September 1997)
- Average home league attendance: 15,159
- Biggest win: 3–0 v West Ham; United (4 October 1997); 4–1 v Barnsley (8 November 1997); 3–0 v Blackburn; Rovers (21 February 1998)
- Biggest defeat: 0–4 v Derby County (27 September 1997)
Home colours	Away colours	Third colours

The 1997–98 Southampton F.C. season was the club's 97th season of competitive football, their 28th (and 20th consecutive) in the top flight of English football, and their sixth in the FA Premier League. It was the first season to feature Dave Jones as the club's manager – the first appointed by new chairman Rupert Lowe, who took over from Guy Askham at the end of 1996–97. The campaign was the Saints' best in the league since 1994–95, as the club finished 12th in the table after two seasons in which they avoided relegation by a single point. Outside the league, however, the club fared less positively – they were eliminated from the FA Cup in the third round after just one game, and only made it to the fourth round of the League Cup.

After taking over from Graeme Souness in June, Jones added two players from his former Stockport County squad: goalkeeper Paul Jones and left-back Lee Todd. He would continue to add new players throughout the campaign, including breaking the club's transfer record with the £2 million signing of striker David Hirst, as well as selling numerous players – many from Souness' tenure. After a poor start to the league campaign which saw them drop into the relegation zone almost immediately, Southampton's form began to pick up following Hirst's arrival in October. As a result, they picked up a number of key wins over high-profile opposition and climbed the table, briefly making it into the top half before finishing in 12th place, eight points clear of the drop zone.

Outside the league, Southampton were eliminated from the FA Cup at the first hurdle for the second season in a row, losing their third round tie to FA Premier League rivals Derby County 0–2 at Pride Park Stadium. In the League Cup, the Saints beat Brentford in both legs of their second round tie, progressing 5–1 on aggregate over a side who would be relegated to the Third Division that season. In the third round they won 2–1 against Barnsley, who had just been promoted to the top flight for the first time in their history (but would be relegated again at the end of the year). The club were eliminated in the fourth round after extra time by Chelsea, who would go on to win the competition after beating First Division promotees Middlesbrough in the final.

Southampton used 31 players during the 1997–98 season and had 11 different goalscorers. Matt Le Tissier finished as the club's top goalscorer for a second season in a row (and seventh and last time overall) with 14 goals in all competitions. Kevin Davies and Egil Østenstad finished just behind Le Tissier on 12 and 11 goals, respectively. New goalkeeper Paul Jones made the most appearances for the club during the campaign and won the Southampton F.C. Player of the Season award at the end of the year. The average league attendance at The Dell during 1997–98 was 15,159. The highest attendance was 15,255 against Tottenham Hotspur in the league in October and the lowest was 8,004 against Brentford in the League Cup in September.

== Background and transfers ==
Ahead of the 1997–98 season, Southampton changed managers for the fourth time in just three years, when Graeme Souness resigned on 24 May 1997 due to disagreements with the club's new chairman Rupert Lowe related to potential spending in the summer transfer window. On the same day, the club's director of football Lawrie McMenemy also left, claiming that he "shared the frustrations" of Souness, while on-loan midfielder Eyal Berkovic – who was set to sign a permanent deal for the Saints – explained that he did not want to stay at the club without Souness. The next day, the Southampton Independent Supporters Association launched a campaign calling for Souness to be reinstated as manager and the new board, led by Lowe, to resign. A month after Souness' resignation, the club announced that Dave Jones, who had just helped Stockport County achieve promotion to the First Division and reach the semi-finals of the League Cup, would be taking over as Southampton manager.

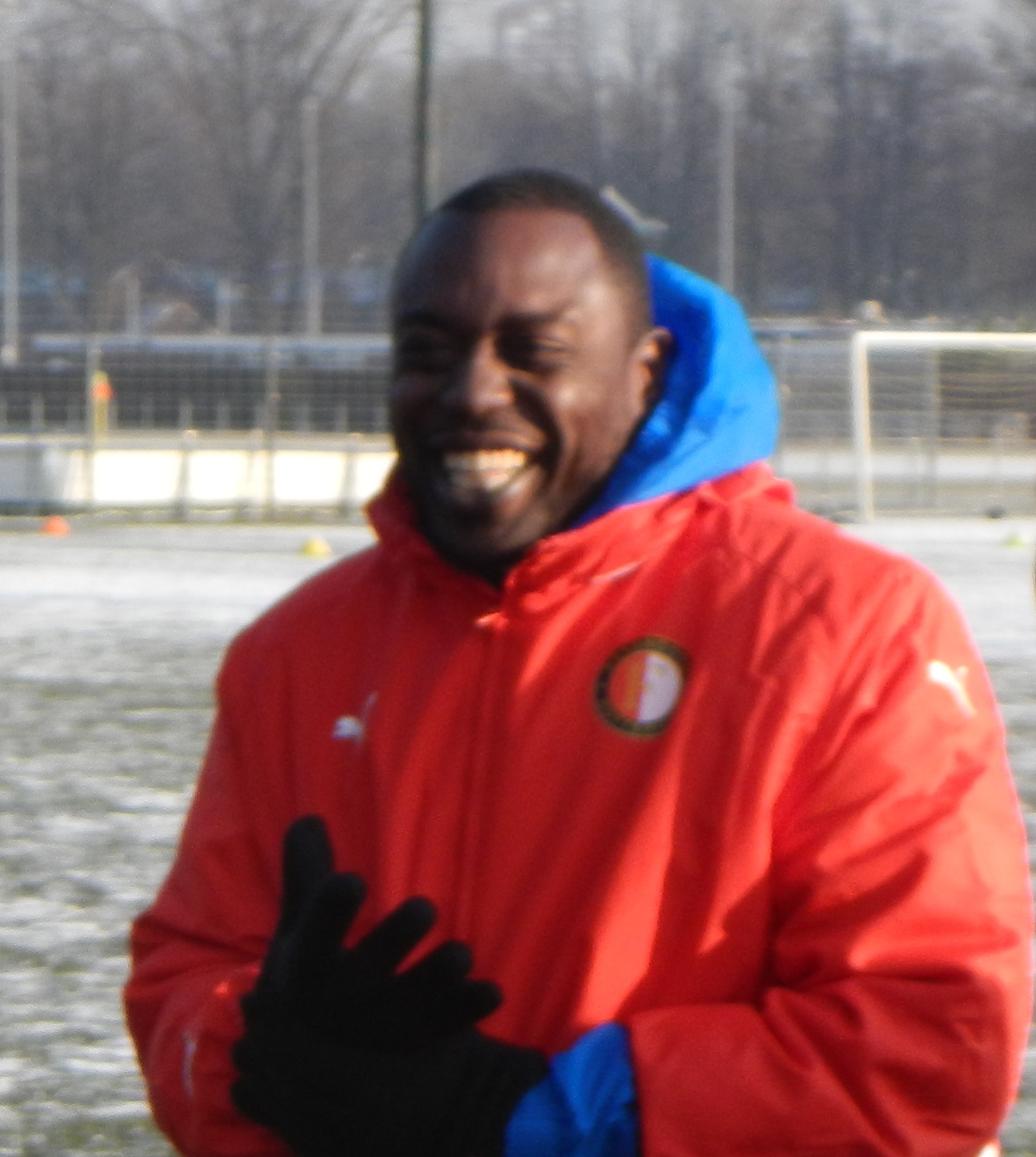
Two games into the season, centre-back Ulrich van Gobbel moved to Dutch side Feyenoord.

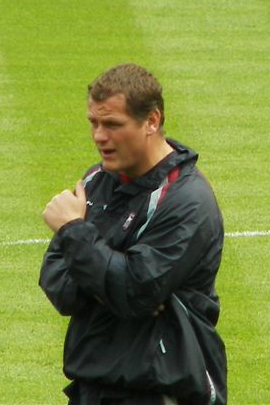
Jim Magilton left the Saints after three seasons in September, sold for £1.6 million to Sheffield Wednesday.

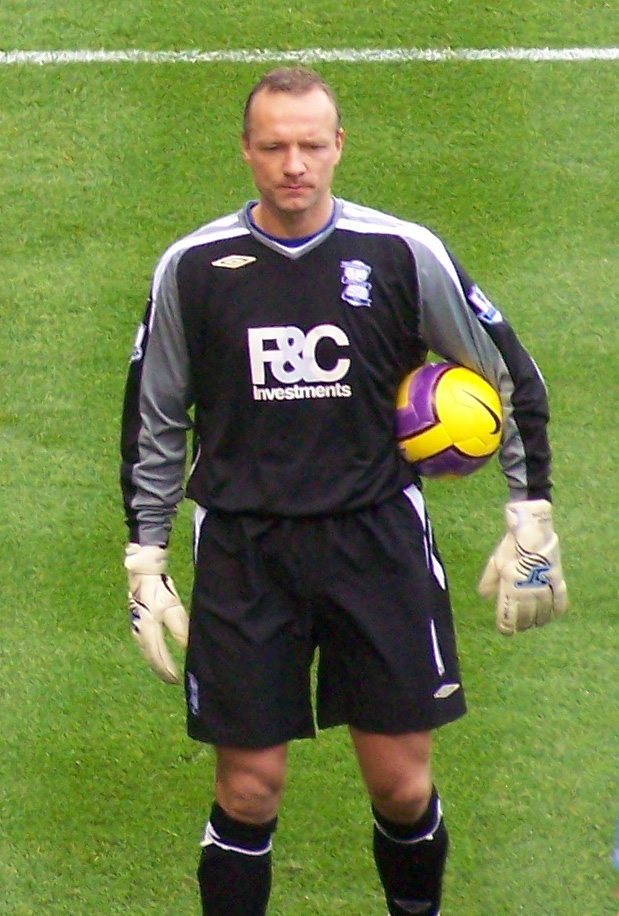
Maik Taylor was sold to Fulham in November after less than a year at the club.

Jones brought two players with him from Stockport County to sign for Southampton: goalkeeper Paul Jones, who had just played every game in Stockport's promotion-winning season, for £900,000, and left-back Lee Todd, who had also been a prominent part of the same team, for £850,000. His only other signing prior to the season starting was Norwegian striker Stig Johansen, who joined from Bodø/Glimt at the beginning of August for £600,000. The next week, Jones made his first sale as Dutch centre-back Ulrich van Gobbel (who had signed for Souness' side just ten months earlier) was sold for £800,000 to club Feyenoord – a loss of £500,000 on his signing less than a year previously.

Squad changes continued throughout the season. In September and October, respectively, midfielders Jim Magilton and Neil Maddison left the club after making over 350 appearances between them – Magilton rejected a new contract and moved to Sheffield Wednesday for £1.6 million, while Maddison moved to Middlesbrough for £300,000, helping them to achieve promotion back to the FA Premier League. The pair were replaced by two new signings: Kevin Richardson from Coventry City for £150,000 and Carlton Palmer from Leeds United for £1 million. Similarly, up front, David Hirst came to Southampton in a club-record £2 million deal from Sheffield Wednesday, replacing Mickey Evans who moved to West Bromwich Albion for £750,000 after just seven months at the club. Further sales before Christmas saw midfielder Christer Warren sold for £50,000 to Bournemouth, goalkeeper Dave Beasant loaned, then sent for free, to Nottingham Forest, and Maik Taylor and Alan Neilson moving to Fulham for £800,000 and £250,000, respectively.

In the new year, left-back Simon Charlton – having lost his place in the team to new arrival Todd and in-form Francis Benali – was sold to Birmingham City in the First Division after a month-long loan spell, for a fee of £200,000. John Beresford was signed as his replacement from Newcastle United a month later, with Jones paying £1.5 million for him – a new club record fee for a defender. Later in February, another left-back, Matthew Robinson, moved to local rivals Portsmouth for £50,000, having made just 17 appearances over a four-season career in the Southampton first team. On transfer deadline day in March, Australian midfielder Robbie Slater joined Wolverhampton Wanderers for £75,000, and the Saints signed Italian midfielder Cosimo Sarli from Torino, although he failed to make an appearance for the first team and was released the following February.

Players transferred in

Name	Nationality	Pos.	Club	Date	Fee	Ref.
Paul Jones	Wales	GK	(England) Stockport County	1 July 1997	£900,000	
Lee Todd	England	DF	(England) Stockport County	1 July 1997	£850,000	
Stig Johansen	Norway	FW	(Norway) Bodø/Glimt	6 August 1997	£600,000	
Kevin Richardson	England	MF	(England) Coventry City	9 September 1997	£150,000	
Carlton Palmer	England	MF	(England) Leeds United	23 September 1997	£1,000,000	
David Hirst	England	FW	(England) Sheffield Wednesday	17 October 1997	£2,000,000	
John Beresford	England	DF	(England) Newcastle United	6 February 1998	£1,500,000	
Cosimo Sarli	Italy	MF	(Italy) Torino	26 March 1998	Free	

Players transferred out

Name	Nationality	Pos.	Club	Date	Fee	Ref.
Ulrich van Gobbel	Netherlands	DF	(Netherlands) Feyenoord	14 August 1997	£800,000	
Jim Magilton	Northern Ireland	MF	(England) Sheffield Wednesday	9 September 1997	£1,600,000	
Christer Warren	England	MF	(England) Bournemouth	10 October 1997	£50,000	
Mickey Evans	Republic of Ireland	FW	(England) West Bromwich Albion	24 October 1997	£750,000	
Neil Maddison	England	MF	(England) Middlesbrough	28 October 1997	£300,000	
Dave Beasant	England	GK	(England) Nottingham Forest	3 November 1997	Free	
Maik Taylor	Northern Ireland	GK	(England) Fulham	14 November 1997	£800,000	
Alan Neilson	Wales	DF	(England) Fulham	26 November 1997	£250,000	
Simon Charlton	England	DF	(England) Birmingham City	8 January 1998	£200,000	
Matthew Robinson	England	DF	(England) Portsmouth	20 February 1998	£50,000	
Robbie Slater	Australia	MF	(England) Wolverhampton Wanderers	26 March 1998	£75,000	

Players loaned in

Name	Nationality	Pos.	Club	Date from	Date to	Ref.
Jason Bowen	Wales	FW	(England) Birmingham City	2 September 1997	29 September 1997	

Players loaned out

Name	Nationality	Pos.	Club	Date from	Date to	Ref.
Dave Beasant	England	GK	(England) Nottingham Forest	21 August 1997	2 November 1997	
Simon Charlton	England	DF	(England) Birmingham City	5 December 1997	5 January 1998	
Steve Basham	England	FW	(Wales) Wrexham	5 February 1998	26 March 1998	
Stig Johansen	Norway	FW	(England) Bristol City	12 February 1998	6 March 1998	

== Pre-season friendlies ==
Ahead of the 1997–98 campaign, Southampton played eight pre-season friendlies. They started their pre-season preparations with a short German tour beginning in mid-July, during which they played five games against local opposition. After a 1–3 loss at Carl Zeiss Jena and a 1–1 draw with Ansbach, the Saints picked up two 2–0 wins over Niederauerbach (in which goals were scored by Jason Dodd and Ulrich van Gobbel) and Idar-Oberstein (in which goals were scored by Steve Basham and trialist Dirk Hebel), before losing the final match 2–4 against Kaiserslautern (Kevin Davies and Egil Østenstad scored for the visitors). Back in England, the FA Premier League side lost 0–1 to First Division side Reading, before beating Luton Town of the Second Division 3–0 and Swindon Town of the First Division 1–0, with Østenstad scoring in both games.

13 July 1997 Friendly	(Germany) Carl Zeiss Jena	3–1	Southampton	Jena, Germany
			Le Tissier	Stadium: Ernst-Abbe-Sportfeld

16 July 1997 Friendly	(Germany) Ansbach	1–1	Southampton	Ansbach, Germany
			Maddison	Stadium: Sportpark Ansbach

20 July 1997 Friendly	(Germany) Niederauerbach	0–2	Southampton	Zweibrücken, Germany
			Dodd van Gobbel	Stadium: Westpfalzstadion

23 July 1997 Friendly	(Germany) Idar-Oberstein	0–2	Southampton	Idar-Oberstein, Germany
			Basham; Hebel	Stadium: Sportgelände Im Haag

25 July 1997 Friendly	(Germany) Kaiserslautern	4–2	Southampton	Kaiserslautern, Germany
			Davies; Østenstad	Stadium: Fritz-Walter-Stadion

28 July 1997 Friendly	Reading	1–0	Southampton	Reading
				Stadium: Elm Park

29 July 1997 Friendly	Luton Town	0–3	Southampton	Luton
			Evans; Maddison; Østenstad	Stadium: Kenilworth Road

2 August 1997 Friendly	Swindon Town	0–1	Southampton	Swindon
			Østenstad	Stadium: County Ground

== FA Premier League ==
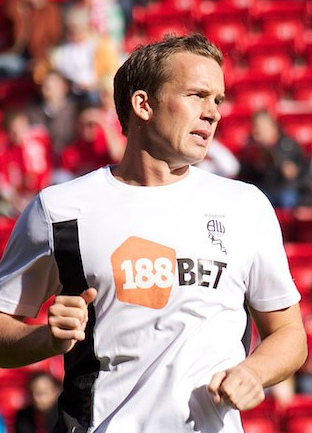
Kevin Davies joined the club just before the end of the 1996–97 season, debuting in the opening game of 1997–98.

Southampton had a poor opening start to the 1997–98 FA Premier League campaign, losing their first two games against recently promoted Bolton Wanderers and reigning champions Manchester United and failing to score in either game. After another loss, 1–3 at home to title challengers Arsenal, the Saints won their first match of the season when they beat Crystal Palace (another team recently promoted from the First Division) 1–0 at The Dell, with Kevin Davies scoring his first goal for the club. Defeats at Chelsea and Coventry City saw the club drop to the bottom of the league table by mid-September. After securing only their fourth point of the campaign with a 1–1 draw at home to Liverpool, the Saints lost 0–2 at home to Leeds United, before suffering their heaviest defeat of the campaign when Derby County – in their new Pride Park Stadium – thrashed the South Coast side 4–0, scoring all four goals in the last 15 minutes of the tie. By the end of September, the club were still bottom of the table, already four points away from safety.

The Saints picked up one of their season's three 3-goal wins at the beginning of October, beating West Ham United 3–0 at The Dell, with goals from Egil Østenstad, Davies and Jason Dodd coming in a single 15-minute spell early in the second half. Another 0–1 loss at Blackburn Rovers followed, before the side fought back twice from trailing positions to beat Tottenham Hotspur 3–2, with new striker David Hirst scoring twice on only his second appearance since joining the previous week. This started a short winning run of three games, which included a 2–0 away victory over Everton, who were also struggling in the bottom quarter of the table, and a 4–1 home win over Barnsley, who had been recently promoted to the top flight for the first time in their history. Following these three consecutive wins, Southampton had risen from 19th to 14th place in the league table. Three marginal defeats followed, however, as the Saints succumbed 1–2 at Newcastle United, 2–3 to Sheffield Wednesday, and 0–1 at Wimbledon.

Mid-December saw Southampton beat Leicester City 2–1 at The Dell, with a 2nd-minute Matt Le Tissier opener followed by full-back Francis Benali scoring the first and only senior goal of his career, heading in a free kick from Le Tissier. A 1–1 draw at Aston Villa followed just before Christmas, during which a late goal from a Le Tissier free kick was disallowed after being taken from the wrong position. The Saints ended 1997 with another 1–1 draw, at Crystal Palace, followed by a 1–0 win over Chelsea, after which they had climbed up to 13th in the FA Premier League standings. This was followed at the beginning of 1998 by a repeat of the first two fixtures of the season – a goalless draw at Bolton Wanderers, in which the Saints played with ten men for almost an hour following Benali's dismissal, was followed by a 1–0 home win over back-to-back title hopefuls Manchester United. Another convincing defeat at Arsenal was followed by a hard-fought 3–2 win over Liverpool in which Østenstad and Hirst both scored in the last six minutes to give the club their first win at Anfield since 1981.

Securing their place around the mid-table area, Southampton secured another run of three consecutive wins starting in late-February: first, they beat top-four side Blackburn Rovers 3–0 at home, with Østenstad scoring twice; the next week, they beat another top-half side, Leeds United, 1–0 at Elland Road; and finally, they won 2–1 against Everton despite Ken Monkou being sent off after just 36 minutes. After losing 3–4 at Barnsley, who were fighting for survival from relegation, the Saints picked up their penultimate win of the campaign over Newcastle United, winning 2–1 at The Dell thanks to a late Le Tissier penalty given for handball. The side's form suffered during April, as they picked up just one point from four games in a "pulsating and totally absorbing" 3–3 draw at Leicester City, losing against Sheffield Wednesday, Wimbledon and Aston Villa in the other three games. A final 4–2 win over West Ham United was followed by a 0–2 loss at home to Derby County and a final day 1–1 draw with Tottenham Hotspur. Southampton finished the season in 12th place with 14 wins, six draws and 18 defeats, marking their highest finish in the league since 10th in the 1994–95 season under manager Alan Ball.

=== List of match results ===
9 August 1997 1	Southampton	0–1	Bolton Wanderers	Southampton
15:00 BST	Oakley (yellow card)	Report	Blake 43'; Frandsen (yellow card); Thompson (yellow card)	Stadium: The Dell; Attendance: 15,206; Referee: Martin Bodenham

13 August 1997 2	Manchester United	1–0	Southampton	Manchester
20:00 BST	Beckham 78'; Irwin (yellow card); Keane (yellow card); P. Neville (yellow card)	Report	Johansen (yellow card)	Stadium: Old Trafford; Attendance: 55,008; Referee: Graham Barber

23 August 1997 3	Southampton	1–3	Arsenal	Southampton
15:00 BST	Maddison 25'; Monkou (yellow card)	Report	Overmars 20'; Bergkamp 57', 79', (yellow card); Bould (yellow card); Wright (yellow card)	Stadium: The Dell; Attendance: 15,246; Referee: David Elleray

27 August 1997 4	Southampton	1–0	Crystal Palace	Southampton
19:45 BST	Davies 57'; Magilton (yellow card); Todd (yellow card)	Report	Edworthy (yellow card); Roberts (yellow card); Warhurst (yellow card)	Stadium: The Dell; Attendance: 15,032; Referee: Jeff Winter

30 August 1997 5	Chelsea	4–2	Southampton	London
15:00 BST	Petrescu 7'; Lebouef 28'; Hughes 31'; Wise 34'; Sinclair (red card) 78'	Report	Davies 25'; Monkou 59', (yellow card); Hughes (yellow card); Neilson (yellow card); Williams (yellow card)	Stadium: Stamford Bridge; Attendance: 30,008; Referee: Alan Wilkie

13 September 1997 6	Coventry City	1–0	Southampton	Coventry
15:00 BST	Soltvedt 65', (yellow card); Williams (yellow card)	Report	Lundekvam (yellow card)	Stadium: Highfield Road; Attendance: 18,659; Referee: Uriah Rennie

20 September 1997 7	Southampton	1–1	Liverpool	Southampton
15:00 BST	Davies 48'; Benali (yellow card); Le Tissier (yellow card)	Report	Riedle 37'; Kvarme (yellow card)	Stadium: The Dell; Attendance: 15,252; Referee: Peter Jones

24 September 1997 8	Southampton	0–2	Leeds United	Southampton
19:45 BST	Davies (yellow card)	Report	Molenaar 36'; Rod Wallace 55'; Halle (yellow card)	Stadium: The Dell; Attendance: 15,102; Referee: Stephen Lodge

27 September 1997 9	Derby County	4–0	Southampton	Derby
15:00 BST	Eranio 76' (pen.); Wanchope 79'; Baiano 82'; Carsley 83'	Report	Davies (yellow card); Dryden (yellow card); Neilson (yellow card)	Stadium: Pride Park Stadium; Attendance: 25,625; Referee: Keith Burge

4 October 1997 10	Southampton	3–0	West Ham United	Southampton
15:00 BST	Østenstad 54'; Davies 65'; Dodd 68'; Richardson (yellow card)	Report	Breacker (yellow card); Pearce (yellow card)	Stadium: The Dell; Attendance: 15,212; Referee: Mike Riley

18 October 1997 11	Blackburn Rovers	1–0	Southampton	Blackburn
15:00 BST	Sherwood 26'	Report	Monkou (yellow card)	Stadium: Ewood Park; Attendance: 24,130; Referee: Gary Willard

25 October 1997 12	Southampton	3–2	Tottenham Hotspur	Southampton
15:00 BST	Campbell 54' (o.g.); Hirst 67', 80'; Palmer (yellow card); Slater (yellow card)	Report	Dominguez 42', (yellow card); Ginola 65'; Vega (yellow card)	Stadium: The Dell; Attendance: 15,255; Referee: Neale Barry

2 November 1997 13	Everton	0–2	Southampton	Liverpool
16:00 GMT	Phelan (yellow card); Short (yellow card); Watson (yellow card)	Report		Stadium: Goodison Park; Attendance: 29,565; Referee: Alan Wilkie

8 November 1997 14	Southampton	4–1	Barnsley	Southampton
15:00 GMT	Le Tissier 3' (pen.), (yellow card); Palmer 5'; Davies 35'; Hirst 54'; Monkou (yellow card)	Report	Bosančić 37' (pen.), (yellow card) de Zeeuw (yellow card); Moses (yellow card); Tinkler (yellow card)	Stadium: The Dell; Attendance: 15,018; Referee: Gerald Ashby

22 November 1997 15	Newcastle United	2–1	Southampton	Newcastle upon Tyne
15:00 GMT	Barnes 55', 75'; Albert (yellow card)	Report	Davies 5'; Hirst (yellow card); Lundekvam (yellow card)	Stadium: St James' Park; Attendance: 36,759; Referee: Dermot Gallagher

29 November 1997 16	Southampton	2–3	Sheffield Wednesday	Southampton
15:00 GMT	Hirst 48'; Palmer 55'; Davies (yellow card)	Report	Atherton 28'; Collins 69'; Di Canio 84'	Stadium: The Dell; Attendance: 15,244; Referee: Steve Dunn

7 December 1997 17	Wimbledon	1–0	Southampton	London
16:00 GMT	Earle 17'	Report	Palmer (yellow card)	Stadium: Selhurst Park; Attendance: 12,009; Referee: Mike Reed

13 December 1997 18	Southampton	2–1	Leicester City	Southampton
15:00 GMT	Le Tissier 1'; Benali 53'; Østenstad (yellow card)	Report	Savage 84'; Keller (yellow card)	Stadium: The Dell; Attendance: 15,121; Referee: Stephen Lodge

20 December 1997 19	Aston Villa	1–1	Southampton	Birmingham
15:00 GMT	Taylor 64'	Report	Østenstad 72'	Stadium: Villa Park; Attendance: 29,343; Referee: David Elleray

26 December 1997 20	Crystal Palace	1–1	Southampton	London
12:00 GMT	Shipperley 62'; Fullarton (yellow card)	Report	Oakley 39'; Benali (yellow card); Hirst (yellow card); Lundekvam (yellow card)	Stadium: Selhurst Park; Attendance: 22,853; Referee: Paul Alcock

29 December 1997 21	Southampton	1–0	Chelsea	Southampton
20:00 GMT	Davies 16'; Palmer (yellow card)	Report	Le Saux (yellow card)	Stadium: The Dell; Attendance: 15,231; Referee: Martin Bodenham

10 January 1998 22	Bolton Wanderers	0–0	Southampton	Bolton
15:00 GMT		Report	Benali (red card) 30'; Davies (yellow card); Dryden (yellow card); Palmer (yellow card)	Stadium: Toughsheet Community Stadium; Attendance: 23,333; Referee: Gary Willard

19 January 1998 23	Southampton	1–0	Manchester United	Southampton
20:00 GMT	Davies 3'; Dodd (yellow card); Le Tissier (yellow card)	Report	Beckham (yellow card); Butt (yellow card); Giggs (yellow card)	Stadium: The Dell; Attendance: 15,241; Referee: Mike Riley

31 January 1998 24	Arsenal	3–0	Southampton	London
15:00 GMT	Bergkamp 62'; Adams 67', (yellow card); Anelka 68'; Platt (yellow card)	Report	Dodd (yellow card); Hirst (yellow card); Monkou (yellow card); Richardson (yellow card)	Stadium: Arsenal Stadium; Attendance: 38,056; Referee: Peter Jones

7 February 1998 25	Liverpool	2–3	Southampton	Liverpool
15:00 GMT	Owen 24', 90'; Fowler (yellow card); James (yellow card)	Report	Hirst 8' (pen.), 90'; Østenstad 85'; Hughes (yellow card); Monkou (yellow card); Williams (yellow card)	Stadium: Anfield; Attendance: 43,550; Referee: Jeff Winter

18 February 1998 26	Southampton	1–2	Coventry City	Southampton
19:45 GMT	Le Tissier 79' (pen.)	Report	Whelan 14'; Huckerby 29'	Stadium: The Dell; Attendance: 15,091; Referee: Paul Alcock

21 February 1998 27	Southampton	3–0	Blackburn Rovers	Southampton
15:00 GMT	Østenstad 19', 88'; Hirst 78'; Oakley (yellow card)	Report	Broomes (yellow card); Hendry (yellow card)	Stadium: The Dell; Attendance: 15,162; Referee: Uriah Rennie

28 February 1998 28	Leeds United	0–1	Southampton	Leeds
15:00 GMT		Report	Palmer (yellow card) (yellow-red card) 76'; Le Tissier (yellow card)	Stadium: Elland Road; Attendance: 28,791; Referee: Keith Burge

7 March 1998 29	Southampton	2–1	Everton	Southampton
15:00 GMT	Monkou (red card) 36'; Le Tissier 69' (pen.); Østenstad 86'	Report	Bilić (red card) 68'; Tiler 89', (yellow card); Hutchison (yellow card); Madar (yellow card)	Stadium: The Dell; Attendance: 15,102; Referee: David Elleray

14 March 1998 30	Barnsley	4–3	Southampton	Barnsley
15:00 GMT	Ward 17'; Jones 32'; Fjørtoft 42'; Redfearn 57' (pen.)	Report	Østenstad 25'; Le Tissier 41', 71'; Lundekvam (yellow card)	Stadium: Oakwell; Attendance: 18,368; Referee: Gerald Ashby

28 March 1998 31	Southampton	2–1	Newcastle United	Southampton
15:00 GMT	Pearce 69' (o.g.); Le Tissier 85' (pen.), (yellow card); Lundekvam (yellow card); Oakley (yellow card); Palmer (yellow card)	Report	Lee 46'; Pistone (yellow card)	Stadium: The Dell; Attendance: 15,251; Referee: Graham Barber

4 April 1998 32	Sheffield Wednesday	1–0	Southampton	Sheffield
15:00 BST	Carbone 78'	Report	Lundekvam (yellow card)	Stadium: Hillsborough Stadium; Attendance: 29,677; Referee: Peter Jones

11 April 1998 33	Southampton	0–1	Wimbledon	Southampton
15:00 BST	Lundekvam (yellow card)	Report	Leaburn 38'	Stadium: The Dell; Attendance: 14,815; Referee: Mike Reed

14 April 1998 34	Leicester City	3–3	Southampton	Leicester
19:45 BST	Lennon 18'; Elliott 52'; Parker 90' (pen.)	Report	Østenstad 17', 27', (yellow card); Hirst 49'; Lundekvam (yellow card)	Stadium: Filbert Street; Attendance: 20,708; Referee: Graham Poll

18 April 1998 35	Southampton	1–2	Aston Villa	Southampton
15:00 BST	Le Tissier 19'	Report	Hendrie 6'; Yorke 60'	Stadium: The Dell; Attendance: 15,238; Referee: Alan Wilkie

25 April 1998 36	West Ham United	2–4	Southampton	London
15:00 BST	Sinclair 42'; Lomas 82'	Report	Le Tissier 40'; Østenstad 63', 86', (yellow card); Palmer 80'	Stadium: Boleyn Ground; Attendance: 25,878; Referee: Dermot Gallagher

2 May 1998 37	Southampton	0–2	Derby County	Southampton
15:00 BST	Benali (red card) 54'; Le Tissier (yellow card)	Report	Dailly 50'; Sturridge 88'. (yellow card); Carsley (yellow card); Kozluk (yellow card); Laursen (yellow card); Wanchope (yellow card)	Stadium: The Dell; Attendance: 15,202; Referee: Mike Riley

10 May 1998 38	Tottenham Hotspur	1–1	Southampton	London
16:00 BST	Klinsmann 27'; Campbell (yellow card)	Report	Le Tissier 21'; Palmer (yellow card)	Stadium: White Hart Lane; Attendance: 35,995; Referee: Peter Jones

=== Final league table ===
Pos	Team	Pld	W	D	L	GF	GA	GD	Pts	Qualification or relegation
10	Leicester City	38	13	14	11	51	41	+10	53	
11	Coventry City	38	12	16	10	46	44	+2	52	
12	Southampton	38	14	6	18	50	55	−5	48	
13	Newcastle United	38	11	11	16	35	44	−9	44	Qualification for the Cup Winners' Cup first round (Note: As Arsenal qualified for the Champions League, their Cup Winners' Cup place as FA Cup winners defaulted to Newcastle United, the runners-up.)
14	Tottenham Hotspur	38	11	11	16	44	56	−12	44	

Source: RSSSF
Rules for classification: 1) points; 2) goal difference; 3) number of goals scored.

=== Results by matchday ===
Round	1	2	3	4	5	6	7	8	9	10	11	12	13	14	15	16	17	18	19	20	21	22	23	24	25	26	27	28	29	30	31	32	33	34	35	36	37	38
Ground	H	A	H	H	A	A	H	H	A	H	A	H	A	H	A	H	A	H	A	A	H	A	H	A	A	H	H	A	H	A	H	A	H	A	H	A	H	A
Result	L	L	L	W	L	L	D	L	L	W	L	W	W	W	L	L	L	W	D	D	W	D	W	L	W	L	W	W	W	L	W	L	L	D	L	W	L	D
Position	18	17	19	16	18	20	20	20	20	19	19	17	16	14	15	16	17	16	15	15	13	13	12	12	11	12	11	11	10	11	10	11	12	12	12	11	12	12

Source: 11v11.com
A = Away; H = Home; W = Win; D = Draw; L = Loss

== FA Cup ==
Southampton entered the 1997–98 FA Cup in an away tie against fellow FA Premier League side Derby County, just over three months after a 0–4 loss at the new Pride Park Stadium in the league. Kevin Davies created a couple of chances to score in the first half, but it was the hosts who came closest to breaking the deadlock through Francesco Baiano and others. It took until the 68th minute for the first goal, when Baiano converted a penalty given for a foul on him by Carlton Palmer – Southampton club historians claim that Palmer "had not even attempted a tackle and no contact was made", crediting Baiano's "amateur dramatics" for gaining the spot kick. Five minutes later, Chris Powell scored a second to put Derby through to the fourth round and eliminate the Saints at the first hurdle.

3 January 1998 Round 3	Derby County	2–0	Southampton	Derby
	Baiano 68' (pen.); C. Powell 73'; D. Powell (yellow card)		Benali (yellow card)	Stadium: Pride Park Stadium; Attendance: 27,992; Referee: Gerald Ashby

== League Cup ==
Southampton entered the 1997–98 League Cup in the second round against Brentford, who were struggling in the lower regions of the Second Division table. In the first game at The Dell, the FA Premier League hosts eased past the third-tier side 3–1, with Ken Monkou, Kevin Davies and Micky Evans all on the scoresheet. A 2–0 win in the return leg at Griffin Park – both goals scored in the first half by Matt Le Tissier – saw the club through. An all-Premier League affair in the third round saw Southampton beat recent promotees Barnsley 2–1 at Oakwell, with Davies scoring a winner in the final two minutes after the game had been level for over an hour. Another top-flight side, Chelsea, hosted the Saints in the fourth round. Davies opened the scoring shortly after the half-time break, but Tore André Flo equalised just ten minutes later. With replays having recently been abandoned in the tournament, the tie went to extra time, when Jody Morris scored just before the end of the second period to put Chelsea through.

17 September 1997 Round 2 Leg 1	Southampton	3–1	Brentford	Southampton
	Monkou 37'; Davies 60'; Evans 69'; Richardson (yellow card)		Taylor 66'; Hurdle (yellow card)	Stadium: The Dell; Attendance: 8,004; Referee: Gary Willard

30 September 1997 Round 2 Leg 2	Brentford	0–2 (1–5 agg.)	Southampton	London
	McGhee (yellow card)		Le Tissier 31', 44', (yellow card); Davies (yellow card)	Stadium: Griffin Park; Attendance: 3,957; Referee: Paul Taylor

14 October 1997 Round 3	Barnsley	1–2	Southampton	Barnsley
	Liddell 26'		Le Tissier 15'; Davies 88'; Lundekvam (yellow card)	Stadium: Oakwell; Attendance: 9,019; Referee: Jeff Winter

19 November 1997 Round 4	Chelsea	2–1 (a.e.t.)	Southampton	London
	Flo 61'; Morris 118'		Davies 52', (yellow card); Palmer (yellow card)	Stadium: Stamford Bridge; Attendance: 20,968; Referee: David Elleray

== Other matches ==
Outside the league and cup competitions, Southampton played three additional matches during the second half of the 1997–98 season. The first was a friendly against Conference side Woking in January, which ended in a 1–1 draw (Kevin Davies scored for the visitors). A second friendly, at Southern League side Dorchester Town, ended in a 2–0 win for the Saints through a David Hirst brace. The final match took place two days after the end of the league season, against recently crowned La Liga champions FC Barcelona. The Spanish hosts won the tie 4–0, with two goals from Iván de la Peña in the first half followed by second-half goals from Mario Rosas and Luis Cembranos.

23 January 1998 Friendly	Woking	1–1	Southampton	Woking
			Davies	Stadium: Kingfield Stadium

20 March 1998 Friendly	Dorchester Town	0–2	Southampton	Dorchester
			Hirst	Stadium: The Avenue Stadium

12 May 1998 Friendly	(Spain) Barcelona	4–0	Southampton	Barcelona, Spain
	de la Peña 23', 39'; Rosas 59'; Cembranos 82'			Stadium: Camp Nou

== Player details ==
Southampton used 31 players during the 1997–98 season, 11 of whom scored during the campaign. 13 players made their debut appearances for the club, including eight of their nine first team signings (John Beresford, Jason Bowen, David Hirst, Stig Johansen, Paul Jones, Carlton Palmer, Kevin Richardson, and Lee Todd), one signing from the previous season (Kevin Davies), and four players making the step up from youth to the first team (Kevin Gibbens, Duncan Spedding, Phil Warner, and Andy Williams). Five of these – Bowen, Johansen, Richardson, Spedding, and Todd – also made their last appearances for the Saints during the campaign, as did mid-season departees Simon Charlton, Mickey Evans, Neil Maddison, Jim Magilton, Alan Neilson, Matthew Robinson, Robbie Slater, and Ulrich van Gobbel. New goalkeeper Jones made the most appearances for Southampton during the season, playing in all 43 games across all three competitions. Matt Le Tissier finished as the club's top goalscorer for the seventh time in the last nine seasons, with 11 goals in the league and three in the League Cup. Jones won the Southampton F.C. Player of the Season award in the 1997–98 season.

=== Squad statistics ===
No.	Name	Pos.	Nat.	League		FA Cup		League Cup		Total		Discipline	
No.	Name	Pos.	Nat.	Apps.	Goals	Apps.	Goals	Apps.	Goals	Apps.	Goals	Yellow card	Red card
1	Paul Jones	GK	(Wales)	38	0	1	0	4	0	43	0	0	0
2	Jason Dodd	DF	(England)	36	1	1	0	3	0	40	1	2	0
3	Lee Todd	DF	(England)	9(1)	0	0	0	1	0	10(1)	0	1	0
4	Carlton Palmer	MF	(England)	26	3	1	0	3	0	30	3	8	1
5	Ken Monkou	DF	(Netherlands)	30(2)	1	1	0	3	1	34(2)	2	6	1
6	Claus Lundekvam	DF	(Norway)	31	0	0	0	4	0	35	0	9	0
7	Matt Le Tissier	MF	(England)	25(1)	11	1	0	3	3	29(1)	14	7	0
8	Matt Oakley	MF	(England)	32(1)	1	1	0	4	0	37(1)	1	3	0
10	Egil Østenstad	FW	(Norway)	21(8)	11	0(1)	0	1	0	22(9)	11	3	0
12	Richard Dryden	DF	(England)	11(2)	0	0	0	1	0	12(2)	0	2	0
13	Neil Moss	GK	(England)	0	0	0	0	0	0	0	0	0	0
14	John Beresford	DF	(England)	10	0	0	0	0	0	10	0	0	0
15	Francis Benali	DF	(England)	32(1)	1	1	0	2(1)	0	35(2)	1	3	2
16	Kevin Davies	FW	(England)	20(5)	9	1	0	3(1)	3	24(6)	12	6	0
17	Cosimo Sarli	FW	(Italy)	0	0	0	0	0	0	0	0	0	0
18	Kevin Richardson	MF	(England)	25(3)	0	1	0	4	0	30(3)	0	3	0
20	Darryl Flahavan	GK	(England)	0	0	0	0	0	0	0	0	0	0
21	Andy Williams	MF	(Wales)	3(17)	0	0(1)	0	1(2)	0	4(20)	0	2	0
23	Duncan Spedding	DF	(England)	4(3)	0	0	0	0(1)	0	4(4)	0	0	0
24	Steve Basham	FW	(England)	0(9)	0	0	0	0	0	0(9)	0	0	0
25	Stig Johansen	FW	(Norway)	3(3)	0	0	0	1(1)	0	4(4)	0	1	0
26	David Hughes	MF	(England)	6(7)	0	1	0	0	0	7(7)	0	2	0
27	David Hirst	FW	(England)	28	9	1	0	1	0	30	9	3	0
28	Kevin Gibbens	MF	(England)	2	0	0	0	0	0	2	0	0	0
29	Phil Warner	DF	(England)	0(1)	0	0	0	0	0	0(1)	0	0	0
Squad members who left before the end of the season
4	Jim Magilton	MF	(Northern Ireland)	5	0	0	0	0	0	5	0	1	0
9	Mickey Evans	FW	(Republic of Ireland)	6(4)	0	0	0	2(1)	1	8(5)	1	0	0
11	Robbie Slater	MF	(Australia)	3(8)	0	0	0	0(1)	0	3(9)	0	1	0
13	Maik Taylor	GK	(Northern Ireland)	0	0	0	0	0	0	0	0	0	0
14	Neil Maddison	MF	(England)	5(1)	1	0	0	0	0	5(1)	1	0	0
17	Simon Charlton	DF	(England)	2(1)	0	0	0	1(1)	0	3(2)	0	0	0
18	Ulrich van Gobbel	DF	(Netherlands)	1(1)	0	0	0	0	0	1(1)	0	0	0
19	Alan Neilson	DF	(Wales)	3(5)	0	0	0	2	0	5(5)	0	2	0
20	Dave Beasant	GK	(England)	0	0	0	0	0	0	0	0	0	0
22	Matthew Robinson	DF	(England)	0(1)	0	0	0	0	0	0(1)	0	0	0
28	Jason Bowen	FW	(Wales)	1(2)	0	0	0	0	0	1(2)	0	0	0

=== Most appearances ===
Rank	Name	Pos.	League		FA Cup		League Cup		Total		
Rank	Name	Pos.	Starts	Subs	Starts	Subs	Starts	Subs	Starts	Subs	Total
1	Paul Jones	GK	38	0	1	0	4	0	43	0	43
2	Jason Dodd	DF	36	0	1	0	3	0	40	1	41
3	Matt Oakley	MF	32	1	1	0	4	0	37	1	38
4	Francis Benali	DF	32	1	1	0	2	1	35	2	37
5	Ken Monkou	DF	30	2	1	0	3	0	34	2	36
6	Claus Lundekvam	DF	31	0	0	0	4	0	35	0	35
7	Kevin Richardson	MF	25	3	1	0	4	0	30	3	33
8	Egil Østenstad	FW	21	8	0	1	1	0	22	9	31
9	David Hirst	FW	28	0	1	0	1	0	30	0	30
9	Carlton Palmer	MF	26	0	1	0	3	0	30	0	30
9	Matt Le Tissier	MF	25	1	1	0	3	0	29	1	30
9	Kevin Davies	FW	20	5	1	0	3	1	24	6	30

=== Top goalscorers ===
Rank	Name	Pos.	League		FA Cup		League Cup		Total		
Rank	Name	Pos.	Goals	Apps	Goals	Apps	Goals	Apps	Goals	Apps	GPG
1	Matt Le Tissier	MF	11	26	0	1	3	3	14	30	0.47
2	Kevin Davies	FW	9	25	0	1	3	4	12	30	0.40
3	Egil Østenstad	FW	11	29	0	1	0	1	11	31	0.35
4	David Hirst	FW	9	28	0	1	0	1	9	30	0.30
5	Carlton Palmer	MF	3	26	0	1	0	3	3	30	0.10
6	Ken Monkou	DF	1	32	0	1	1	3	2	36	0.06
7	Neil Maddison	MF	1	6	0	0	0	0	1	6	0.17
7	Mickey Evans	FW	0	10	0	0	1	3	1	13	0.08
7	Francis Benali	DF	1	33	0	1	0	3	1	37	0.03
7	Matt Oakley	MF	1	33	0	1	0	4	1	38	0.03
7	Jason Dodd	DF	1	36	0	1	0	3	1	40	0.03

== Bibliography ==
- Holley, Duncan; Chalk, Gary (2003), Bull, David (ed.), In That Number: A Post-War Chronicle of Southampton FC, Bristol, England: Hagiology Publishing, ISBN 0-9534474-3-X
