= Matt Oakley =

British footballer (born 1977)

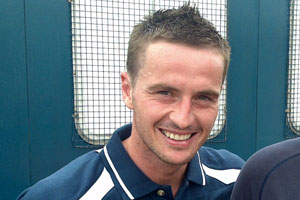
- Oakley in 2009

Personal information
- Full name: Matthew Oakley
- Date of birth: 17 August 1977 (age 49)
- Place of birth: Peterborough, England
- Height: 5 ft 10 in (1.78 m)
- Position: Midfielder

Youth career
- 1993–1994: Southampton

Senior career*
Years	Team	Apps	(Gls)
1994–2006	Southampton	261	(14)
2006–2008	Derby County	56	(9)
2008–2012	Leicester City	137	(10)
2011	→ Exeter City (loan)	7	(0)
2012–2017	Exeter City	153	(0)
Total		614	(33)

International career
1997–1998	England U21	3	(0)
- * Club domestic league appearances and goals

Matthew Oakley (born 17 August 1977) is an English football coach and former professional footballer.

As a player, he was a midfielder, notably in the Premier League with Southampton playing there for over a decade, including their defeat to Arsenal in the 2003 FA Cup Final. However, a serious injury cost him nearly two years of football but managed 261 league appearances during his time with the club. He also played in the Premier League for Derby County who he had captained the club to promotion via the Championship play-offs in 2007. He also played for Championship side Leicester City where he was the team captain from 2008 to 2011. He could not prevent their relegation to League One. He enjoyed an injury-free season when he captained the team to promotion as league winners at the first attempt. He finished his career playing for Exeter City, in League One and League Two.

Following retirement, Oakley was added to the Coaching staff at Exeter by manager Paul Tisdale in 2017 as Assistant Manager he then followed Tisdale to Milton Keynes Dons as assistant manager but was dismissed in 2019.

== Club career ==
=== Southampton ===
Born in Peterborough, Cambridgeshire, Oakley joined Southampton's youth training scheme, and made his debut at Everton at the age of 17 on 6 May 1995, whilst still a trainee. He turned professional soon afterwards. His skilful displays for Southampton were star studded that he would watch video clips of himself in action. He played for Southampton in the 2003 FA Cup final against Arsenal, finishing runners-up as they lost 1–0.

He became a regular first team player in the 1996–97 season, when he scored three goals in 28 games as the Saints avoided relegation in 16th place. He would remain a regular player for most of the next decade.

Oakley's injury woes began in September 2003 when he suffered damaged knee ligaments in a 1–0 defeat to Middlesbrough, sidelining him for six weeks. However, he had to undergo an operation in November after aggravating his injury during rehabilitation, keeping him out of contention for the rest of the 2003–04 season. Oakley felt he was "very lucky" after he recovered in May 2004. He aggravated his injury again during Southampton's trip to Sweden, missing out on the start of the following season.

His injury proneness nearly cost him two years of football in his last seasons at Southampton. Oakley spent majority of the 2004–05 season recuperating on the sidelines, suffering another setback along the way, while Southampton struggled for form. In January 2005, Rotherham United offered to sign him on loan in an effort to help him regain his fitness. Oakley watched helplessly as an unused substitute as Southampton were relegated from the Premier League on 15 May 2005, after a 2–1 defeat to Manchester United.

In 2005–06, Oakley was back to full fitness and was once again a first team regular, making 29 league appearances and scoring two goals. He played his last match for Southampton in a 3–0 league win over Sheffield Wednesday on 25 February 2006. Then-manager George Burley commented on Oakley in May 2006, "I've not seen the best of Matt Oakley yet but I believe he can recapture his best form. If he's fully fit again he will be very valuable." Unconvinced with Oakley's form, he was only offered a one-year extension to his contract.

"I spent 12 years at a fantastic club, but they are in a bad position. I'm hoping that we are going to take the points, but I will be sad if they're dropping down the table."

— On his return to Southampton with Leicester City in March 2008.

On 28 June 2006, Oakley rejected Burley's offer, and absented himself from pre-season training. As he was then approaching 29, he had hoped for a contract that would take him towards the end of his career – and take in a talked-of testimonial match. His departure ended 12 years of service after having played a total of 311 games for the club. Oakley then spent pre-season training with then Premier League team Charlton Athletic, who offered him a one-year deal, and was also chased by Ipswich Town.

=== Derby County ===
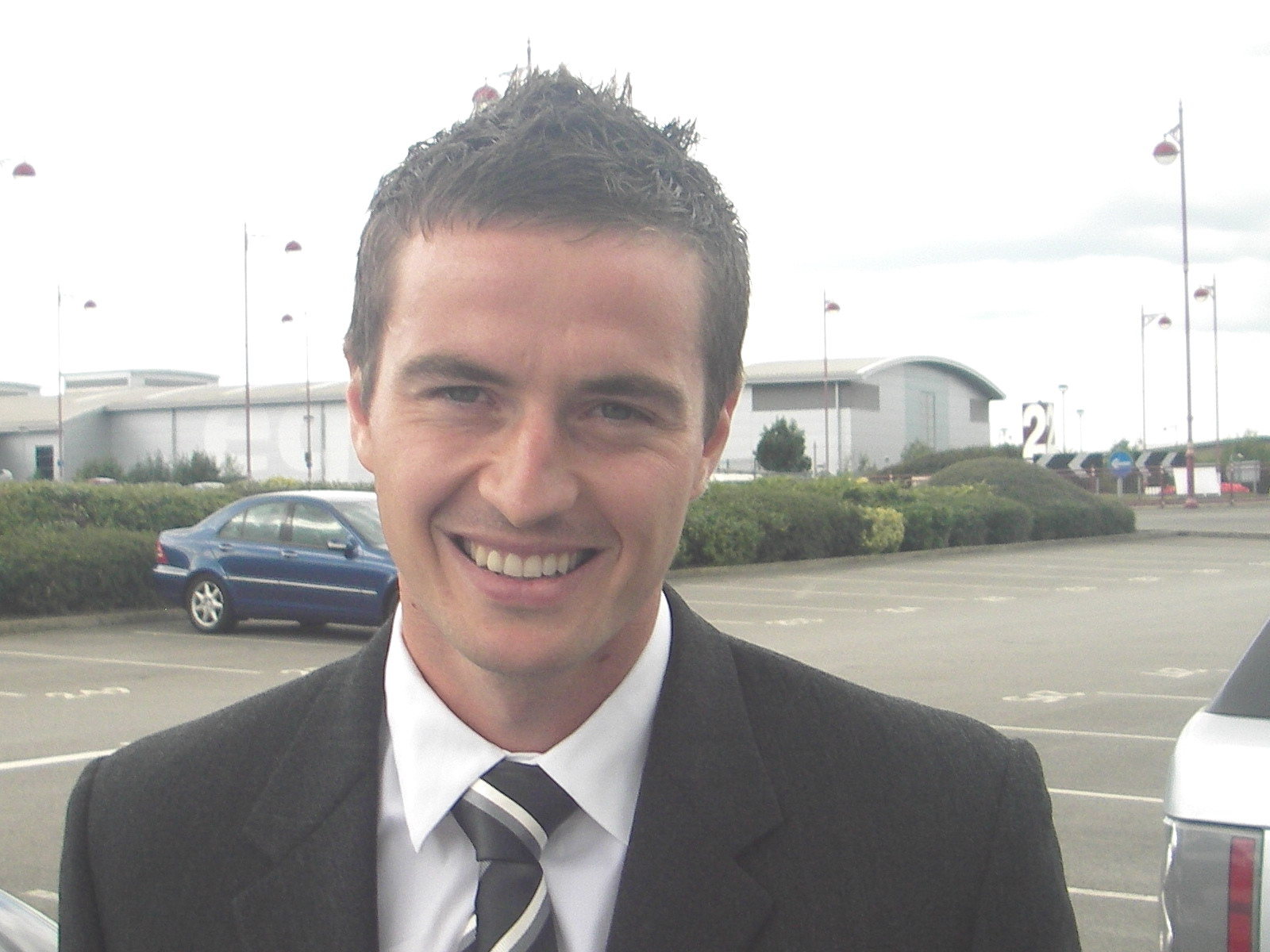
Oakley in his Derby County days

On 4 August 2006, he signed a three-year contract with Derby County on a free transfer. Oakley was immediately named team captain, with Michael Johnson becoming club captain. He made his debut in a 2–0 defeat to Stoke City on 8 August 2006.

Oakley's first goal for Derby came in the first away win of the season against Hull City. His lashed half volley sent Derby on their way to a 2–1 win. He also scored the winner in the home match against West Bromwich Albion. His thunderous 30-yard strike capped off a fine comeback by the Rams. And following his trend in scoring sublime goals, Oakley scored a 16-yard half volley into the top of the net proving to be the winner in a 2–1 win. He went on to captain the side to play-off success confirming their return to the Premier League with a 1–0 win over West Bromwich Albion.

However, Oakley admitted that the Derby squad still lacked Premier League experience and felt the need for additional signings. With Derby bottom of the table by 2008, 10 points from safety, Oakley declared that the team had to beat Bolton Wanderers on 3 January or "the season's over." Derby lost the match 1–0. That same month, Derby granted Leicester City permission to open contract talks with Oakley. He played his last match for the club in a 2–2 FA Cup draw against Sheffield Wednesday on 6 January 2008. In his one and a half years at Derby, Oakley was injured only once, a bruised ankle in a match against Crystal Palace in December 2006.

=== Leicester City ===
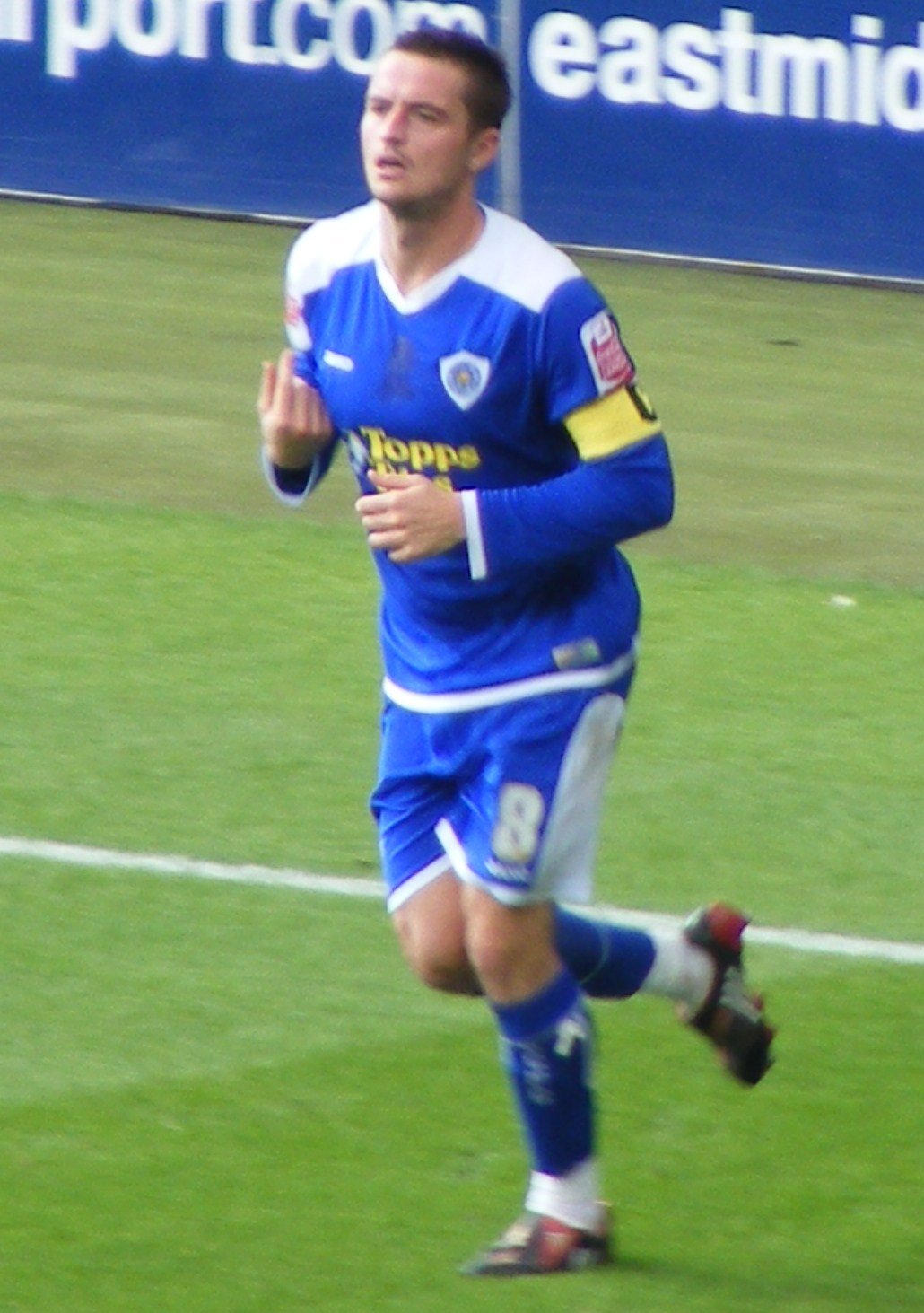
Oakley playing for Leicester City in September 2008

Oakley moved to Leicester City on 11 January 2008 for a fee of £500,000, signing a three-and-a-half-year contract. Surprised at being allowed to leave Pride Park, he was reunited with Derby teammate Steve Howard, who had joined Leicester ten days earlier. Chairman Milan Mandarić described the signing as "very, very important." Oakley made his league debut in an M69 derby on 12 January, beating Coventry City 2–0 at the Walkers Stadium. He enjoyed a short partnership with Stephen Clemence in central midfield before the latter was injured in March 2008. Oakley's arrival could not prevent the club's season from ending in relegation.

Oakley became captain the following season due to club captain Stephen Clemence's long-term injury (which forced him to retire on Easter Monday 2010). He scored his first league goal for the club in a 4–0 win over Cheltenham Town on 30 August 2008. Despite leading the club to a four-point lead at the top of League One by December 2008, Oakley warned his teammates of complacency.

In January 2009, Oakley played exceptionally well during his temporary partnership with on-loan midfielder Mark Davies. His superb form during that month earned him the League One Player of the Month award on 9 February. He played a key role in helping Leicester to a 23-game unbeaten run from September 2008 to March 2009. He led by example with a series of commanding displays, scoring eight goals to help Leicester secure their promotion as League One champions. Oakley was named in the League One PFA Team of the Year together with teammates Jack Hobbs and Matty Fryatt on 26 April 2009. His goal against Cheltenham Town on 7 March 2009, was voted Leicester's goal of the season in April 2009.

Oakley formed a fine midfield partnership with Richie Wellens as the club made an impressive start to the 2009–10 season, which saw them seventh in the Championship by September 2009. In early December 2009 however, Leicester were heavily beaten by Nottingham Forest and Bristol City. But after following from those losses by beating Sheffield Wednesday 3–0 on 12 December, Oakley believed they were back on track. Compared to last season, he suffered a goal famine and admitted he needed to contribute more as an attacking force. In February 2010, the club adopted the 4–3–3 formation, with a midfield trio comprising Oakley, Wellens and Andy King. He made his 100th competitive game for Leicester in a 1–1 draw against Bristol City on 16 February, and his 100th league appearance in a 2–1 defeat to Reading at the Walkers Stadium on 24 March. Oakley played a total of 38 league matches to help Leicester qualify for the Championship play-offs, but was not selected for the semi-final legs as Cardiff City won 4–3 on penalties.

In the 2010–11 season, Oakley played his 500th competitive match in a 2–0 defeat to Millwall on 28 December 2010. He signed a new contract with the club on 24 March 2011, which would last until June 2012. The following day, Oakley relinquished his position as captain and handed over the role to teammate Andy King. He finally scored his first league goal since April 2009 in a 1–1 draw against Crystal Palace on 12 April 2011, followed by another on 22 April in a 3–2 defeat to Nottingham Forest. Oakley played a total of 36 competitive games, as Leicester finished the season in 10th position.

On 20 March 2012, Oakley agreed by mutual consent to have his contract ended.

=== Exeter City ===
Despite playing only twice in the League Cup for the 2011–12 season, Leicester denied that Oakley was to rejoin Derby County on loan. On 30 September 2011, Oakley joined League One side Exeter City on loan for a month with the option of extending it until the end of the season. He made his debut in a 2–0 win over Oldham Athletic on 1 October 2011, drawing praise from manager Paul Tisdale for his performance. A thigh injury suffered in a 0–0 draw against Carlisle United on 5 November 2011 forced Oakley to return to Leicester after playing seven league games. Tisdale's concern about "taking somebody back that's injured", coupled with Leicester being unable to confirm Oakley's availability made it unlikely he will rejoin Exeter on loan.

After being released by Leicester Oakley spent the 2012 pre-season training with Exeter City and after much speculation it was announced on 31 July 2012 that he had signed a permanent deal with the Grecians.

Oakley retired as a player at the end of the 2016–17 season, after the 2–1 defeat by Blackpool in the end of season play-offs.

== International career ==
Oakley has three caps for the England U21 team. He showed tremendous promise as a teenager and Gordon Strachan tipped him for the England squad in February 2003. While he was rumoured to be under serious consideration, he was not named in the first squad of 2003 for the friendly against Australia.

== Coaching career ==
After a year coaching at Exeter City, on 6 June 2018 Oakley moved with manager Paul Tisdale to Milton Keynes Dons as assistant manager. After achieving promotion with MK Dons from League Two at the conclusion of the 2018–19 season, Oakley's contract with the club was terminated along with manager Paul Tisdale on 2 November 2019 following a poor run of results.

== Other interests ==
Oakley is known to be a collector of South American red-bellied piranha, stating "I wanted something unusual, and piranhas certainly make feeding time interesting".

== Career statistics ==
Appearances and goals by club, season and competition
Club	Season	League			FA Cup		League Cup		Other (Note: Includes Football League Trophy and Football League play-off.)		Europe		Total	
Club	Season	Division	Apps	Goals	Apps	Goals	Apps	Goals	Apps	Goals	Apps	Goals	Apps	Goals
Southampton	1994–95	Premier League	1	0	0	0	0	0	–		–		1	0
Southampton	1995–96	Premier League	10	0	3	1	0	0	–		–		13	1
Southampton	1996–97	Premier League	28	3	1	0	6	0	–		–		35	3
Southampton	1997–98	Premier League	33	1	1	0	4	0	–		–		38	1
Southampton	1998–99	Premier League	22	2	2	0	0	0	–		–		24	2
Southampton	1999–2000	Premier League	31	3	1	0	4	2	–		–		36	5
Southampton	2000–01	Premier League	35	1	3	0	3	0	–		–		41	1
Southampton	2001–02	Premier League	27	1	0	0	3	0	–		–		30	1
Southampton	2002–03	Premier League	31	0	7	2	2	0	–		–		40	2
Southampton	2003–04	Premier League	7	0	0	0	0	0	–		1	0	8	0
Southampton	2004–05	Premier League	7	1	5	1	0	0	–		–		12	2
Southampton	2005–06	Championship	29	2	2	0	0	0	–		–		31	2
Southampton	Total		261	14	25	4	22	2	–		1	0	309	20
Derby County	2006–07	Championship	37	6	1	0	1	0	3 (Note: Three appearances in Championship play-offs)	0	–		42	6
Derby County	2007–08	Premier League	19	3	1	0	0	0	–		–		20	3
Derby County	Total		56	9	2	0	1	0	3	0	–		62	9
Leicester City	2007–08	Championship	20	0	0	0	0	0	–		–		20	0
Leicester City	2008–09	League One	45	8	2	0	0	0	1	0	–		48	8
Leicester City	2009–10	Championship	38	0	2	0	2	0	0 (Note: Oakley did not appear in either of Leicester City's 2 Championship play-off matches.)	0	–		42	0
Leicester City	2010–11	Championship	34	2	1	0	1	0	–		–		36	2
Leicester City	2011–12	Championship	0	0	0	0	2	0	–		–		2	0
Leicester City	Total		137	10	5	0	5	0	1	0	–		148	10
Exeter City (loan)	2011–12	League One	7	0	0	0	0	0	0	0	–		7	0
Exeter City	2012–13	League Two	36	0	1	0	0	0	0	0	–		37	0
Exeter City	2013–14	League Two	24	0	0	0	0	0	0	0	–		24	0
Exeter City	2014–15	League Two	45	0	1	0	1	0	1	0	–		48	0
Exeter City	2015–16	League Two	29	0	3	0	1	0	0	0	–		33	0
Exeter City	2016–17	League Two	19	0	1	0	0	0	3	0	–		23	0
Exeter City	Total		153	0	6	0	2	0	4	0	–		165	0
Career total			614	33	38	4	30	2	8	0	1	0	691	39

== Honours ==
Southampton

- FA Cup runner-up: 2002–03

Derby County

- Football League Championship play-offs: 2007

Leicester City

- Football League One: 2008–09

Individual

- PFA Team of the Year: 2008–09 League One
