= Cosimo Sarli =

Italian footballer (born 1979)

Personal information
- Date of birth: 13 March 1979 (age 47)
- Place of birth: Corigliano Calabro, Italy
- Height: 1.80 m (5 ft 11 in)
- Position: Striker

Youth career
- Schiavonea

Senior career*
Years	Team	Apps	(Gls)
1997–1998	Torino	0	(0)
1998	Southampton	0	(0)
1998–1999	Eendracht Aalst	10	(7)
1999–2000	Nice	14	(2)
2000	Eendracht Aalst	4	(1)
2000–2002	Crotone	23	(3)
2002–2003	Aglianese	12	(0)
2003	Montichiari	23	(12)
2003–2004	Aglianese	10	(4)
2004	Montichiari	11	(2)
2004–2005	Legnano	25	(5)
2005–2006	Pro Sesto	2	(0)
2006	Cosenza	21	(13)
2006–2007	Scafatese	31	(25)
2007	Catanzaro	9	(1)
2007–2008	Aversa Normanna	20	(16)
2008–2009	Siracusa	34	(20)
2009	Aversa Normanna	12	(3)
2009–2010	Messina	16	(6)
2010–2011	Casertana	31	(21)
2011–2012	Ischia	23	(11)
2012	Taranto	1	(0)
2013	Rossanese		
2013–2014	Castrovillari		
2014–2015	Bastia	13	(3)
2015–2016	Corigliano		
2016–2018	Rossanese		
2020	Racing Capri		
- * Club domestic league appearances and goals

Cosimo Sarli (born 13 March 1979) is a well-travelled Italian former footballer who played as a striker. He is nicknamed "Cobra".

== Career ==
Born in Corigliano Calabro, Sarli began his professional career at Torino but failed to break into the first team. After spells outside Italy with Southampton (England), Eendracht Aalst (Belgium) and Nice (France), he returned to his home country, spending most of his career in the lower divisions.

In 2000, he joined Crotone in Serie B, where he scored 3 goals in 23 appearances. His career continued in the lower divisions (Serie C2 and Serie D) with various clubs, including Cosenza, Scafatese, Aversa Normanna, Siracusa and Casertana.

On 20 July 2011, he moved to Ischia in Serie D.
