= Francis Benali =

English footballer (born 1968)

Francis Benali MBE
Personal information
- Full name: Francis Vincent Benali
- Date of birth: 30 December 1968 (age 57)
- Place of birth: Southampton, England
- Height: 5 ft 9 in (1.75 m)
- Position: Full back

Youth career
- 1985–1988: Southampton

Senior career*
Years	Team	Apps	(Gls)
1988–2004	Southampton	311	(1)
2001	→ Nottingham Forest (loan)	15	(0)
2006–2008	Eastleigh	22	(0)
Total		348	(1)
- * Club domestic league appearances and goals

Francis Vincent Benali MBE (born 30 December 1968) is an English football coach and former professional player.

As a player, he was a full back who notably spent most of his career in the Premier League with Southampton, during a sixteen-year spell he notched up a total of 373 appearances in all competitions, scoring just once. He was named as one of "Southampton's Cult Heroes," in a book by Jeremy Wilson in October 2006. He also played for Nottingham Forest on loan in 2001 and later finished his career with a two-year spell at non-league side Eastleigh.

Following his retirement, Benali has coached at Southampton's academy as well as with semi-professional side Romsey Town. He is also noted for his charity work and co-founded a football management agency with former teammate Matt Le Tissier. Benali was appointed Member of the Order of the British Empire (MBE) in the 2020 New Year Honours for services to cancer patients in the UK.

== Playing career ==
Benali was born in Southampton and attended Bellemoor School. He played for Winsor United in the Southampton Tyro League. At this level he was playing as a forward and was a prolific goal-scorer, being an early developer and quicker and stronger than most footballers of his age. He was selected to represent Southampton and Hampshire Schools, and progressed to the England schoolboy team, scoring on his debut against Northern Ireland and making nine appearances at this level.

Benali made his first team debut on 1 October 1988, coming off the bench against Derby County, in a 0–0 draw at The Dell. His first start came soon after on 25 October 1988 at White Hart Lane against Tottenham Hotspur in a 2–1 win. He soon became a mainstay in the Saints team, going on to make a total of 389 appearances for the club, including 243 Premier League appearances. His only FA Premier League goal came on 13 December 1997 with a header from a Matthew Le Tissier free-kick against Leicester City at The Dell.

After losing his first-team place to Wayne Bridge, in January 2003, Benali returned to the starting line-up making two league appearances against Sunderland and Manchester United as well as two in the FA Cup against Millwall. Although Benali did not appear in the FA Cup Final on 17 May 2003, he was awarded a runners-up medal for his two appearances in Round 4. The replay against Millwall turned out to be his final competitive appearance for Southampton.

His final appearance in the Southampton first-team came as a substitute in the inaugural Ted Bates trophy match in January 2004 against Bayern Munich.

== Coaching career ==
In July 2003, Benali joined the coaching staff at St. Mary's and took charge of the under-12 side at the Academy.

On the departure of manager Harry Redknapp in December 2005, Benali and Matthew Le Tissier put themselves forward as joint candidates for the vacant position, but were not interviewed by chairman Rupert Lowe.

Benali had a two-year spell coaching at Romsey Town first coaching his son Luke in the under-18s before managing the club's reserve side.

== Charitable activities ==
In August/September 2014, Benali completed a three-week 1,000-mile (1,600 km) challenge running to all 20 Premier League grounds, raising in excess of £100,000 for the charity Cancer Research UK. As a result, he became the first recipient to be awarded with the Spirit of the Game award in December 2014. He was also awarded the Just Giving Celebrity Fundraiser of the Year award in September 2015.

In October 2016, Benali completed another ultra-challenge, running and cycling to all 44 Premier League and Championship stadiums in 2 weeks. He ran a marathon and cycled 75 miles each day and in the process raised over £350,000 for Cancer Research UK. Following this, he was awarded the freedom of the city of Southampton.

In April 2019 it was announced that Benali would race seven Ironmans in seven days, as part of his aim to raise £1million for Cancer Research UK. Despite being hospitalised, Benali completed five Ironmans, raising £1million.

Benali was appointed Member of the Order of the British Empire (MBE) in the 2020 New Year Honours for services to cancer patients in the UK.

Benali has been a patron of the following charities:

- The Children's Fire and Burn Trust
- The Dave Wellman Cancer Trust

He is also an ambassador for Southampton FC's charity Saints Foundation, alongside his daughter Kenzie Benali.

He is also an ambassador for the Saints Disabled Supporters' Association.

== Media career ==
Alongside his charitable activities, Benali has worked as a pundit and commentator, mainly on Southampton matches. In November 2023, he joined the Southern Daily Echo as a weekly columnist.

== Personal life ==
He is the father of television presenter, event host and blogger Kenzie Benali, and Luke Benali, who briefly played non-league football for Winchester City during the 2015–16 season.

Benali, alongside Matt Le Tissier was the founder in October 2003 of the True Greats website.

In 2016, Benali was one of four founders of 73 Management, a football management agency, again along with ex-teammate Le Tissier.

== Career statistics ==
Appearances and goals by club, season and competition
Club	Season	League			FA Cup		League Cup		Other		Total	
Club	Season	Division	Apps	Goals	Apps	Goals	Apps	Goals	Apps	Goals	Apps	Goals
Southampton
Southampton	1988–99	First Division	7	0	0	0	2	0	—		9	0
Southampton	1989–90	First Division	27	0	3	0	6	0	—		36	0
Southampton	1990–91	First Division	12	0	2	0	3	0	—		17	0
Southampton	1991–92	First Division	22	0	6	0	0	0	1 (Note: Appearance in Full Members' Cup Final)	0	29	0
Southampton	1992–93	Premier League	33	0	1	0	3	0	—		37	0
Southampton	1993–94	Premier League	37	0	1	0	2	0	—		40	0
Southampton	1994–95	Premier League	35	0	4	0	3	0	—		42	0
Southampton	1995–96	Premier League	29	0	1	0	4	0	—		34	0
Southampton	1996–97	Premier League	18	0	1	0	0	0	—		19	0
Southampton	1997–98	Premier League	33	1	1	0	3	0	—		37	1
Southampton	1998–99	Premier League	23	0	0	0	2	0	—		25	0
Southampton	1999–2000	Premier League	26	0	1	0	3	0	—		30	0
Southampton	2000–01	Premier League	4	0	0	0	0	0	—		4	0
Southampton	2001–02	Premier League	3	0	0	0	0	0	—		3	0
Southampton	2002–03	Premier League	2	0	2	0	0	0	—		4	0
Southampton	Total		311	1	23	0	31	0	1	0	366	1
Nottingham Forest (loan)	2000–01	First Division	15	0	0	0	0	0	—		15	0
Eastleigh	2006–07	Conference South	22	0	0	0	—		—		22	0
Career total			348	1	23	0	31	0	1	0	403	1

== Honours ==
Southampton

- FA Cup runner-up: 2002–03
- Full Members' Cup runner-up: 1991–92

Individual

- Barclays Spirit of the Game: 2014
- Just Giving Celebrity Fundraiser of the Year: 2015
- Honorary Doctorate of Sport from Southampton Solent University, July 2016
- Freedom of Southampton, November 2016

== Bibliography ==
- Chalk, Gary; Holley, Duncan (1987). Saints – A complete record. Breedon Books. ISBN 0-907969-22-4. |
- Chalk, Gary; Holley, Duncan; Bull, David (2013), All the Saints: A Complete Players' Who's Who of Southampton FC, Hagiology Publishing, ISBN 978-0-9926864-0-6
- Holley, Duncan; Chalk, Gary (2003). In That Number – A post-war chronicle of Southampton FC. Hagiology Publishing. ISBN 0-9534474-3-X.
- Wilson, Jeremy (2006). Southampton's Cult Heroes. Know The Score Books. ISBN 1-905449-01-1.
