= Alan Blayney =

Northern Irish footballer (born 1981)

Personal information
- Date of birth: 9 October 1981 (age 45)
- Place of birth: Belfast, Northern Ireland
- Height: 6 ft 2 in (1.88 m)
- Position: Goalkeeper

Team information
- Current team: Larne (goalkeeping coach)

Youth career
- 1997–2001: Glentoran

Senior career*
Years	Team	Apps	(Gls)
2001–2006	Southampton	3	(0)
2002	→ Stockport County (loan)	2	(0)
2002–2003	→ AFC Bournemouth (loan)	2	(0)
2005	→ Rushden & Diamonds (loan)	4	(0)
2005	→ Brighton & Hove Albion (loan)	7	(0)
2005	→ Brighton & Hove Albion (loan)	8	(0)
2006–2007	Doncaster Rovers	24	(0)
2007	Oldham Athletic	1	(0)
2007	Bohemians	3	(0)
2008–2009	Ballymena United	32	(0)
2009–2014	Linfield	118	(0)
2014	→ Ards (loan)	11	(0)
2014–2015	Glenavon	17	(0)
2015–2017	Ballymena United	34	(0)
2017	Dundela	4	(0)
2017	Warrenpoint Town	6	(0)
2018	Ballyclare Comrades	5	(0)
Total		281	(0)

International career
2002–2003	Northern Ireland U21	5	(0)
2006–2011	Northern Ireland	5	(0)
- * Club domestic league appearances and goals

Alan Blayney (born 9 October 1981) is a retired professional footballer who played as a goalkeeper and is now the first team goalkeeper coach at NIFL Premiership side Larne.

Beginning his professional career with Southampton in the Premier League where he made three appearances, Blayney had additional loan spells with Stockport County, AFC Bournemouth, Rushden & Diamonds and Brighton & Hove Albion (twice). He then spent just over a year with Doncaster Rovers before having successive quick spells with Oldham Athletic and Bohemians, before returning to his native Northern Ireland with Ballymena United. After one season he moved to Linfield where he won three league titles and three Irish Cups. He subsequently played for Glenavon, Ballymena United again, Dundela, Warrenpoint Town and Ballyclare Comrades before retiring.

He also represented Northern Ireland at international level and under-21 level, winning five caps for both sides.

== Club career ==
=== England ===
Born from Belfast, Northern Ireland, Blayney started his career with Premiership side Southampton and was loaned out to Stockport County, but the loan was cut short by a broken finger. He also he had a spell at AFC Bournemouth on loan. He made his début for Southampton in May 2004, receiving a high amount of praise. Blayney also won Sky Sports save of the season after saving an Alan Shearer header in May 2004 on his Premier League debut. The match at St Mary's ended in a 3–3 draw. Blayney also played in the following 2–1 defeat at Charlton. Blayney would play two more games for Southampton the following season, the 2–2 Premier League draw against West Bromwich Albion and the 5–2 League Cup loss against Watford. Blayney, who was then behind Antti Niemi and Paul Smith in the team's pecking order went on loan to Rushden & Diamonds and Brighton & Hove Albion. Brighton tried to sign Blayney on a permanent basis in 2005, but could not afford the transfer fee Southampton were asking. Blayney did return to Brighton & Hove Albion for a second loan spell, before returning to Southampton in mid-December.

Blayney then joined Doncaster Rovers for £50,000 from Southampton in January 2006, signing a two-and-a-half-year contract, with hopes of getting the team promoted to the Championship. Blayney started off as first choice goalkeeper at Belle Vue stadium, but fell behind Ben Smith and Dane Jan Budtz in the pecking order after an ankle injury. He decided to leave the club for personal reasons.

In February 2007, Blayney joined League One side Oldham Athletic, until the end of the 2006–07 season, after impressing in a reserve team match. Blayney made his début for Oldham Athletic in a 1–2 home defeat against Bournemouth, after first choice goalkeeper Les Pogliacomi was suspended.

=== League of Ireland & Irish League ===
On 7 August, Alan Blayney joined Irish side Bohemians on a short term deal to provide cover for first choice goalkeeper Brian Murphy. He marked his debut with a clean sheet as Bohs beat Bray Wanderers 3–0 on 31 August. He failed to gain the number 1 shirt from Brian Murphy though and was released at the end of the season.

On 15 March 2008, Blayney signed for Irish Premiership side Ballymena United, although he was unable to play for the Braidmen until the 2008–09 season. In June 2009, Blayney signed a three-year contract for Linfield. Following good performances for Linfield on their way to the 2010–11 IFA Premiership title, Blayney was chosen as the Ulster Footballer of the Year for the 2010–11 season. He joined fellow NIFL Premiership club Ards on loan for the second half of the 2013–14 season.

Following his loan spell at Ards, Blayney left Linfield at the end of the 2013–14 NIFL Premiership season to sign for 2013–14 Irish Cup winners Glenavon. Despite a strong start to the season, Blayney later lost his starting spot at Glenavon to number two goalkeeper James McGrath, and left the club for a second spell at Ballymena United on 5 May 2015.

Blayney initially started his second spell at Ballymena as the number one choice, following the departure of Australian goalkeeper Tim Allen. However, the arrival of former Linfield manager David Jeffrey saw his game time limited, with Linfield loanee Ross Glendinning usurping Blayney as number one during the 2016–17 season. The return of Tim Allen to the club meant that Blayney was free to talk to other clubs. He left Ballymena by mutual consent on 27 January 2017.

Blayney signed for NIFL Premier Intermediate League side Dundela on 1 February 2017. He returned to the NIFL Premiership in the 2017-18 season, having signed a pre-contract with 2016–17 NIFL Championship winners Warrenpoint Town.

On 14 December 2017, it was announced that Blayney had signed for Ballyclare Comrades.

== International football ==
Blayney, a former Northern Ireland under-21 international, played his first match for the Northern Ireland senior national team in their 2006 summer tour of the United States. Northern Ireland lost the match against Romania 2–0. He followed this with three appearances in 2010.

== Honours ==
Linfield

- IFA Premiership: 2009–10, 2010–11, 2011–12
- Irish Cup: 2009–10, 2010–11, 2011–12
