= Fabrice Fernandes =

French footballer (born 1979)

Personal information
- Full name: Fabrice Fernandes
- Date of birth: 29 October 1979 (age 47)
- Place of birth: Aubervilliers, France
- Height: 1.72 m (5 ft 8 in)
- Position: Winger

Senior career*
Years	Team	Apps	(Gls)
1998–2001	Rennes	33	(3)
2000–2001	→ Fulham (loan)	29	(2)
2001	→ Rangers (loan)	4	(1)
2001	→ Marseille (loan)	4	(0)
2001–2005	Southampton	91	(5)
2005–2006	Bolton Wanderers	1	(0)
2006–2007	Beitar Jerusalem	20	(2)
2007–2008	Dinamo București	7	(0)
2008	Le Havre	0	(0)
Total		189	(13)
- * Club domestic league appearances and goals

Fabrice Fernandes (born 29 October 1979) is a French former professional footballer who played as a winger for several clubs, most particularly Southampton.

== Career ==
Fernandes spent three years at the INF Clairefontaine academy, before moving to Rennes in 1996.

He first joined an English team in 2000, after signing a season-long loan deal at Fulham where he helped them get promoted to the Premier League. He played for the France national under-21 football team, impressing the likes of Rangers in the process, for whom he joined on loan in March 2001, scoring on his debut for the club, from 20 yards out against Motherwell.

In December 2001, he moved to Southampton, making his debut in a defeat against Leeds United. Despite occasional injuries, he featured in many matches that season. He earned an FA Cup runners-up medal in 2003 and enjoyed a strong 2003–04 campaign, which concluded with the offer of a new contract running until 2006.

However, after Southampton were relegated to the Championship under manager Harry Redknapp at the end of the 2004–05 season, Fernandes negotiated for release from his contract. The Saints needed to reduce their payroll and engaged the services of agent Willie McKay to find a new club for him. Allegedly, McKay was paid a fee of £30,000 by Southampton for his services. This transfer was amongst those being scrutinised by the Stevens enquiry into corruption in English football.

Sam Allardyce snapped him up for free at the end of August 2005 and he made his debut for Bolton in their first ever UEFA Cup game against Lokomotiv Plovdiv at the Reebok Stadium. He appeared once in the league for Bolton, as a substitute in a 5–1 defeat to Chelsea.

In February 2006 Fernandes moved to play in Israel for Beitar Jerusalem, the club owned by Arcadi Gaydamak, the father of Portsmouth owner Alexandre Gaydamak. After leaving the Jerusalem club he has had trial spells with Stoke City and Dunfermline Athletic.

In January 2007, he joined Dinamo Bucharest (Romania) in the Romanian First League, but was released a year later. From there he joined Le Havre before retiring from the game.

== Honours ==
Fulham

- Football League First Division: 2000–01

Southampton

- FA Cup runner-up: 2002–03

Beitar Jerusalem

- Israeli Premier League: 2006–07

Dinamo Bucuresti

- Liga I: 2006–07
- Romanian Supercup runner-up: 2007
