= 1996–97 Southampton F.C. season =

Southampton F.C.
1996–97 season
- Chairman: Guy Askham
- Manager: Dave Merrington (until 14 June 1996); Graeme Souness (from 3 July 1996)
- Stadium: The Dell
- FA Premier League: 16th
- FA Cup: Third round
- League Cup: Fifth round
- Top goalscorer: League: Matt Le Tissier (13); All: Matt Le Tissier (16)
- Highest home attendance: 15,253 v Manchester; United (26 October 1996)
- Lowest home attendance: 10,737 v Oxford United (18 December 1996)
- Average home league attendance: 15,099
- Biggest win: 4–0 v Middlesbrough (28 September 1996)
- Biggest defeat: 1–7 v Everton (16 November 1996)
Home colours	Away colours	Third colours

The 1996–97 Southampton F.C. season was the club's 96th season of competitive football, their 27th in the top flight of English football, and their fifth in the FA Premier League. It was the sole season to feature Graeme Souness as the club's manager, who took over from Dave Merrington in the summer of 1996. After finishing 17th and avoiding relegation on goal difference the previous season, the Saints had another poor campaign as they improved their league position by just one place, finishing a single point above the drop zone. Outside the league, the club were knocked out of the FA Cup in the third round, but made it to the fifth round of the League Cup for the first time since 1991. This was the last season with chairman Guy Askham, who left in 1997.

Following his arrival in July, Souness made several changes to the Southampton squad – notable new signings included Norwegian striker Egil Østenstad, Dutch right-back Ulrich van Gobbel and Norwegian centre-back Claus Lundekvam, while major outgoings included the sales of striker Neil Shipperley, centre-back Richard Hall and winger Neil Heaney. The most infamous transfer activity took place during November, when the club signed unproven Senegalese striker Ali Dia for a matter of weeks, before releasing him again after one 53-minute appearance. All the changes brought mixed results, as the club struggled throughout much of the season, before an unbeaten run of seven games in the final weeks of the campaign secured their top-flight survival.

Outside the league, Southampton were eliminated from the FA Cup in the third round when they lost 1–3 to First Division side Reading, who had also knocked the Saints out of the League Cup the previous year. In the 1996–97 edition of the latter tournament, the Saints fared much better, reaching the quarter-finals for the first time since 1991. On the way to the fifth round, they eased past Peterborough United (who were struggling in, and would ultimately be relegated from, the Second Division), beat Third Division club Lincoln City in a replayed third round tie, and made it past First Division side Oxford United (again after a replay). They were ultimately eliminated by another Second Division side, Stockport County, who were on their way to achieving promotion.

Southampton used 31 players during the 1996–97 season and had 15 different goalscorers. After one season off the top of the goalscoring charts, Matt Le Tissier finished as the club's top scorer for the sixth time in eight seasons, with 13 league and three League Cup goals. Jim Magilton made the most appearances for a second season out of three, playing in 46 of the team's 48 games during the campaign. Østenstad, who finished just behind Le Tissier on 13 goals, won the Southampton F.C. Player of the Season award. The average league attendance at The Dell during 1996–97 was 15,099. The highest attendance was 15,253 against Manchester United in October and the lowest was 10,737 against Oxford United in the League Cup in December.

== Background and transfers ==
Shortly after the end of the 1995–96 season, manager Dave Merrington was sacked by the Southampton board. The decision was described by club historians in 2003 as an "abandonment" of the manager, who had saved the club from relegation in the final stages of the season, earning him the Premier League Manager of the Month award for April 1996 (during which the Saints had won three out of their six games). In a statement to the media, Merrington commented that "To say it's a great shock is a massive understatement ... I'm leaving with deep regret and sadness". Southern Daily Echo columnist Graham Hiley wrote that "Twelve years of loyal service were wiped out in a terse two-paragraph statement ... The man who brought through Matthew Le Tissier, Alan Shearer, the Wallaces [Ray and Rod] and many others appears to have been ruthlessly discarded like litter left on the terraces." A couple of weeks later, Merrington was replaced by former Rangers, Liverpool and Galatasaray manager Graeme Souness.

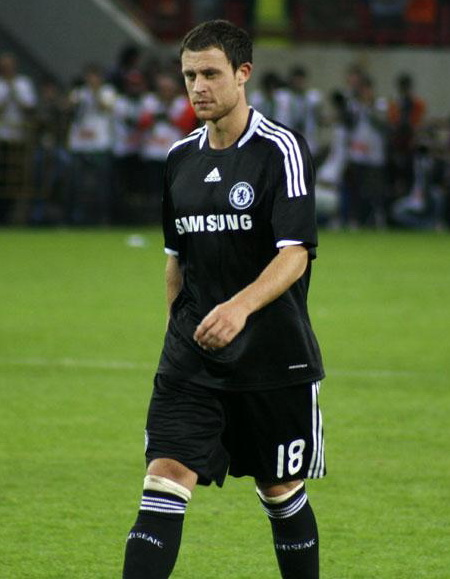
Wayne Bridge started his Southampton career as a trainee in 1996 and would go on to play 174 times for the club.

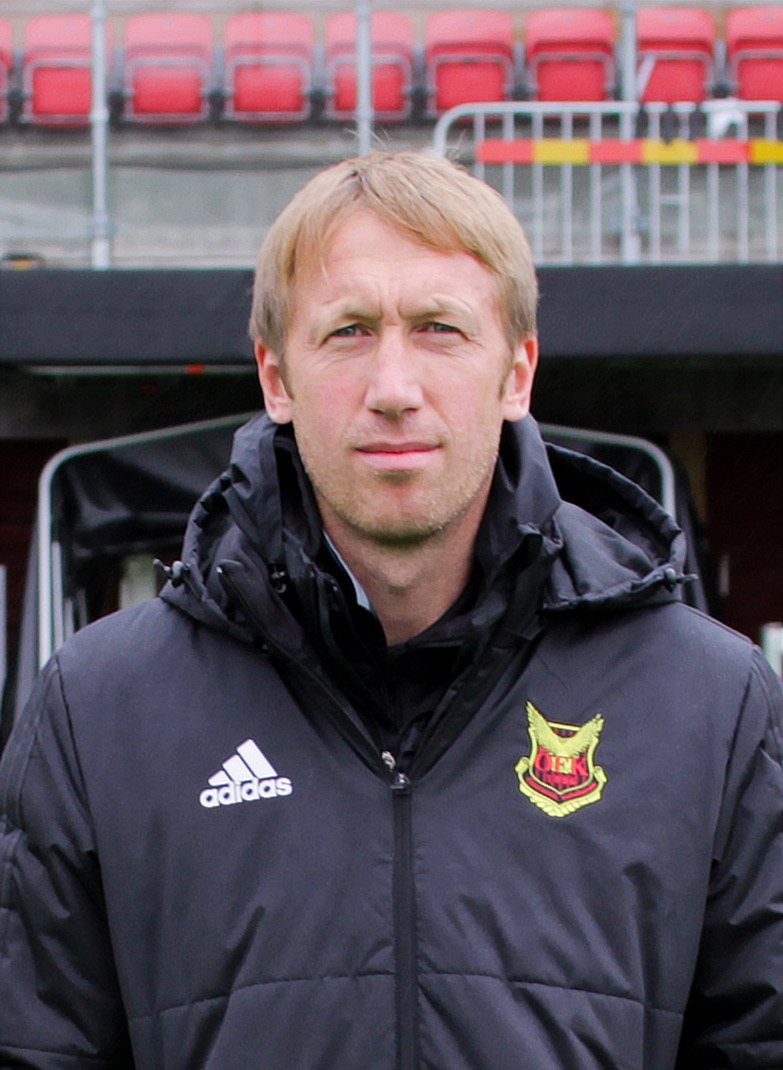
Graeme Souness' first signing for Southampton was left-back Graham Potter from Stoke City for £250,000.

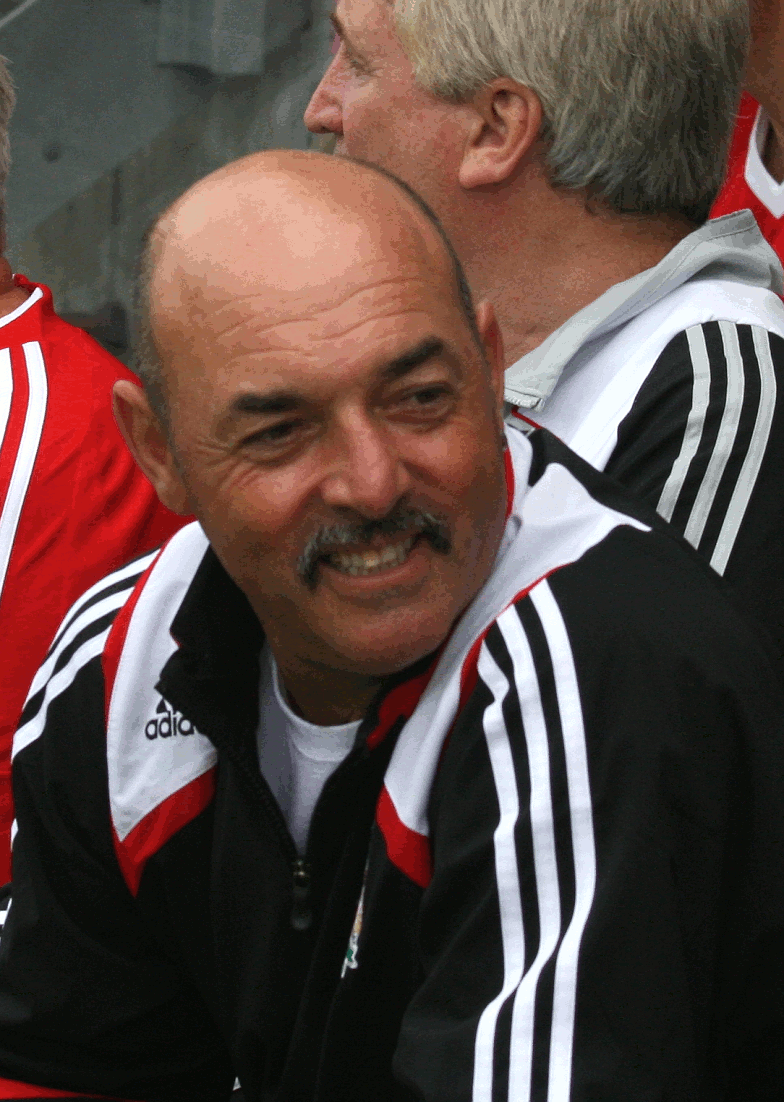
After losing his status as first-choice goalkeeper, Bruce Grobbelaar left for Plymouth Argyle during pre-season.

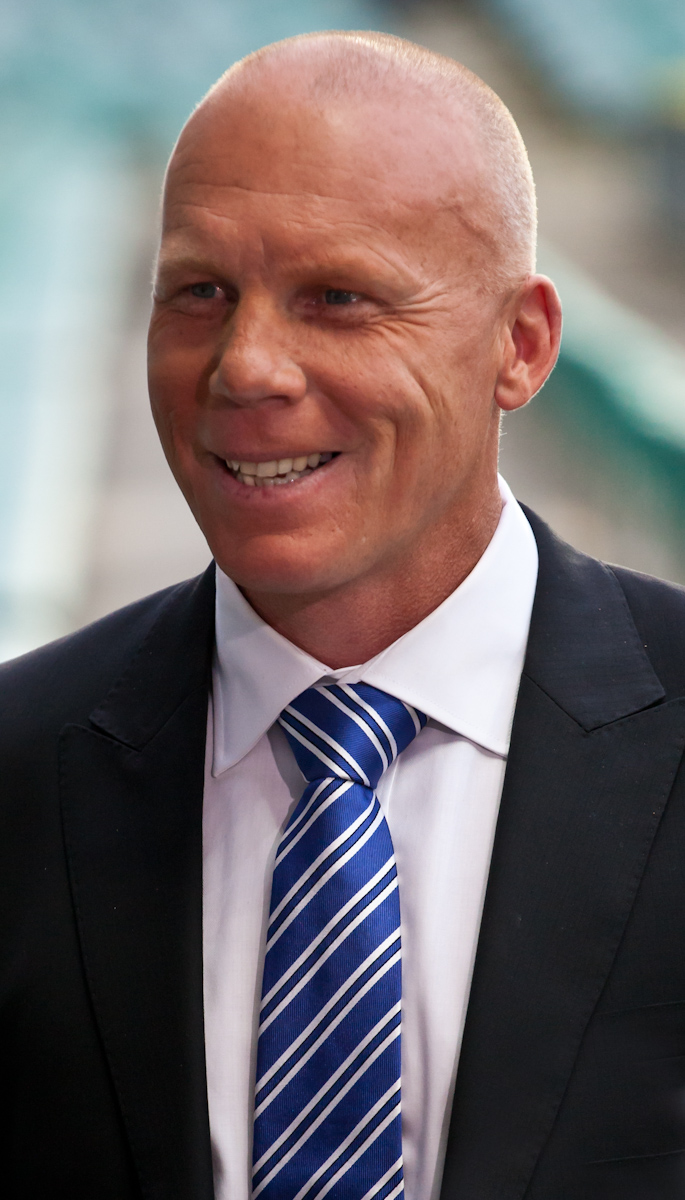
Australian midfielder Robbie Slater signed from West Ham United in September and made 38 appearances in his first of two seasons at the club.

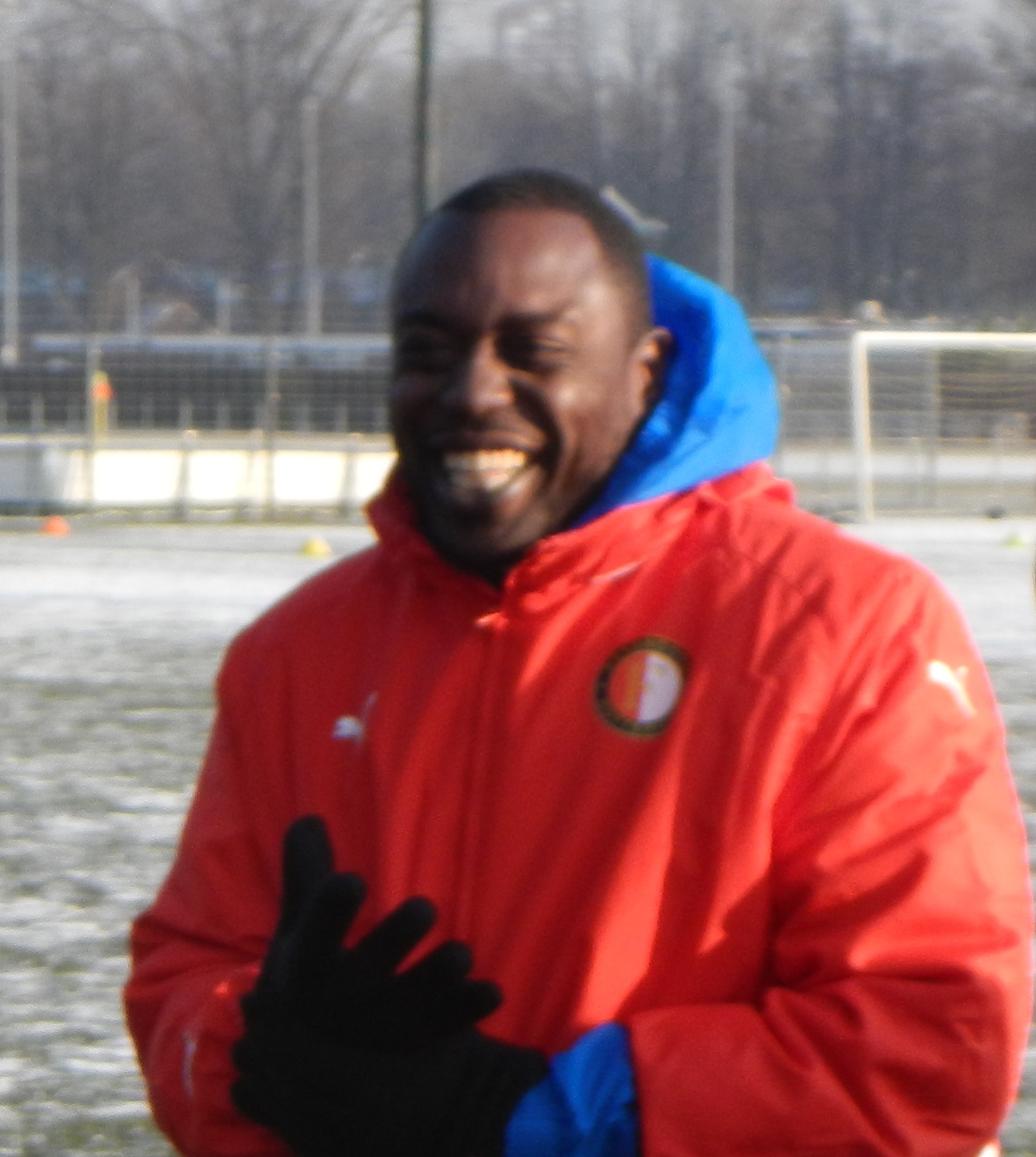
Souness signed Dutch centre-back Ulrich van Gobbel from his former club Galatasaray in October for £1.3 million.

Souness' first two signings came courtesy of tips from assistant manager Terry Cooper – left-back Graham Potter, who Cooper had managed at Birmingham City in 1992–93, joined from First Division side Stoke City for £250,000, while centre-back Richard Dryden, a member of Cooper's Exeter City team from 1988 to 1991, signed from Bristol City in the Second Division for £150,000. Among three trainee signings in July came left-back Wayne Bridge, who would go on to make 174 appearances for the Southampton first team during a five-year stint, before later spells with top clubs Chelsea and Manchester City. Souness also sold five players ahead of the league starting – midfielder Tommy Widdrington moved to Grimsby Town in the First Division for a club record fee of £300,000, out-of-contract defender Richard Hall was snapped up by West Ham United for a tribunal-set fee of £1.4 million, winger Mark Walters moved on a free transfer to Swindon Town, who had been recently promoted to the First Division, defender Derek Allan moved to Brighton & Hove Albion in the Third Division, three years since his sole substitute appearance for the Saints, and goalkeeper Bruce Grobbelaar moved on a free transfer to third-tier club Plymouth Argyle.

Changes to the squad continued throughout the season. At the beginning of September, the club signed three players in three days, as they brought in 19-year-old striker Russell Watkinson from non-league side Woking, Norwegian centre-back Claus Lundekvam from Brann for £400,000, and Australian midfielder Robbie Slater from West Ham for £200,000. The next month, another Norwegian international, 24-year-old striker Egil Østenstad, was signed for £800,000 from Viking, while Dutch centre-back Ulrich van Gobbel, who Souness had signed just nine months earlier at Galatasaray, arrived in a near-record £1.3 million deal. Østenstad was brought in to replace Neil Shipperley, who subsequently moved later the same month for £1 million to First Division side Crystal Palace, whom he chose over Portsmouth. Also arriving in loan deals during October were Israeli playmaker Eyal Berkovic, who joined from Maccabi Haifa until the end of the season, and goalkeeper Chris Woods, who came from American club Colorado Rapids until the next March.

During November, winger Neil Heaney and striker Frankie Bennett moved to Manchester City and Bristol Rovers, respectively. The most notable transfer activity, however, was the brief signing of Senegalese striker Ali Dia, who would go down as one of the "worst players" in FA Premier League and world football history. After an uneventful early career in mainland Europe, Dia joined English non-league club Blyth Spartans in November 1996, before days later making the five-division jump to Southampton just a few days after his only game for the club. According to reports, Souness was convinced to give Dia a trial after receiving a phone call from someone purporting to be George Weah, the most recent winner of the FIFA World Player of the Year award, who claimed that the pair had been teammates at French side Paris Saint-Germain, and that Dia had played (and scored) for the Senegal national team. Dia made an "embarrassing" appearance as a substitute when several strikers were out injured, before he was released after just two weeks.

After Christmas, the club spent £500,000 on Northern Irish goalkeeper Maik Taylor, who joined Souness' side from Third Division side Barnet on the recommendation of recently departed manager Ray Clemence. In the new year, striker Gordon Watson moved for the same fee to Bradford City, who were fighting against relegation from the First Division having recently been promoted. Graham Potter, who had been signed only seven months earlier, left Southampton in February for £300,000 (a profit of £50,000) to join West Bromwich Albion, another First Division side. In March, Souness spent another £500,000 to sign Republic of Ireland striker Mickey Evans from Plymouth Argyle to help with the closing stages of the campaign. The same month, Christer Warren – who had earlier in the year spent a week at Brighton – joined Fulham on loan until the end of the season.

Players transferred in

Name	Nationality	Pos.	Club	Date	Fee	Ref.
Graham Potter	England	DF	(England) Stoke City	23 July 1996	£250,000	
Wayne Bridge	England	DF	(England) Olivers Battery	July 1996	Free (Note: Wayne Bridge was initially signed as a trainee in July 1996, before turning professional in January 1998.)	
Kevin Gibbens	England	MF	(England) Lordswood	July 1996	Free (Note: Kevin Gibbens was initially signed as a trainee in July 1996, before turning professional in January 1998.)	
Garry Monk	England	DF	(England) Torquay United	July 1996	Free (Note: Garry Monk was initially signed as a trainee in July 1996, before turning professional the following May.)	
Richard Dryden	England	DF	(England) Bristol City	6 August 1996	£150,000	
Russell Watkinson	England	FW	(England) Woking	1 September 1996	Free	
Claus Lundekvam	Norway	DF	(Norway) Brann	2 September 1996	£400,000	
Robbie Slater	Australia	MF	(England) West Ham United	3 September 1996	£200,000	
Egil Østenstad	Norway	FW	(Norway) Viking	3 October 1996	£800,000	
Ulrich van Gobbel	Netherlands	DF	(Turkey) Galatasaray	15 October 1996	£1,300,000	
Ali Dia	Senegal	FW	(England) Blyth Spartans	November 1996	Free (Note: Ali Dia was signed on a trial basis for a month, although this was cut short after two weeks and he was released.)	
Maik Taylor	Northern Ireland	GK	(England) Barnet	31 December 1996	£500,000	
Mickey Evans	Republic of Ireland	FW	(England) Plymouth Argyle	3 March 1997	£500,000	
Kevin Davies	England	FW	(England) Chesterfield	8 May 1997	£750,000	

Players transferred out

Name	Nationality	Pos.	Club	Date	Fee	Ref.
Tommy Widdrington	England	MF	(England) Grimsby Town	11 July 1996	£300,000	
Richard Hall	England	DF	(England) West Ham United	19 July 1996	£1,400,000	
Mark Walters	England	MF	(England) Swindon Town	31 July 1996	Free	
Derek Allan	Scotland	DF	(England) Brighton & Hove Albion	1 August 1996	Free	
Bruce Grobbelaar	Zimbabwe	GK	(England) Plymouth Argyle	12 August 1996	Free	
Neil Shipperley	England	FW	(England) Crystal Palace	25 October 1996	£1,000,000	
Neil Heaney	England	MF	(England) Manchester City	23 November 1996	£500,000	
Frankie Bennett	England	FW	(England) Bristol Rovers	29 November 1996	£50,000	
Gordon Watson	England	FW	(England) Bradford City	15 January 1997	£500,000	
Graham Potter	England	DF	(England) West Bromwich Albion	14 February 1997	£300,000	

Players loaned in

Name	Nationality	Pos.	Club	Date from	Date to	Ref.
Eyal Berkovic	Israel	MF	(Israel) Maccabi Haifa	9 October 1996	End of season	
Chris Woods	England	GK	(United States) Colorado Rapids	31 October 1996	25 March 1997	

Players loaned out

Name	Nationality	Pos.	Club	Date from	Date to	Ref.
Christer Warren	England	MF	(England) Brighton & Hove Albion	11 October 1996	19 October 1996	
Frankie Bennett	England	FW	(England) Shrewsbury Town	25 October 1996	12 November 1996	
Paul Tisdale	England	MF	(England) Huddersfield Town	29 November 1996	14 December 1996	
Christer Warren	England	MF	(England) Fulham	7 March 1997	End of season	

Players released

Name	Nationality	Pos.	Date	Subsequent club	Ref.
Ali Dia	Senegal	FW	November 1996	(England) Gateshead	

Players retired

Name	Nationality	Pos.	Date	Reason	Ref.
Barry Venison	England	DF	October 1996	Retired due to a back injury, subsequently became a television pundit.	

== Pre-season friendlies ==
Ahead of the 1996–97 campaign, Southampton played eight pre-season friendlies. Like the previous season, they started their pre-season preparations with a short tour of Ireland, beating both Cork City and Waterford United 1–0, thanks to goals from Neil Heaney and Gordon Watson, respectively. This was followed by a 3–1 win over Southern League side Cheltenham Town (in which Graham Potter, who had signed just three days earlier, scored one of the Saints' goals) and two matches at Scottish opposition: a 2–2 draw with Dunfermline Athletic and a 0–1 defeat at Heart of Midlothian. Another 0–1 loss at Wycombe Wanderers of the Second Division was followed by a 1–2 defeat to Oxford United (as part of the Oxford Benevolent Cup pre-season tournament) and a 0–2 loss at Greek side PAOK.

22 July 1996 Friendly	Cork City	0–1	Southampton	Cork, Ireland
			Heaney	Stadium: Turners Cross

24 July 1996 Friendly	Waterford United	0–1	Southampton	Waterford, Ireland
			Watson	Stadium: Waterford RSC

26 July 1996 Friendly	Cheltenham Town	1–3	Southampton	Cheltenham
			Potter; Shipperley; Watson	Stadium: Whaddon Road

31 July 1996 Friendly	Dunfermline Athletic	2–2	Southampton	Dunfermline, Scotland
			Le Tissier own goal	Stadium: East End Park

3 August 1996 Friendly	Heart of Midlothian	1–0	Southampton	Edinburgh, Scotland
				Stadium: Tynecastle Park

6 August 1996 Friendly	Wycombe Wanderers	1–0	Southampton	High Wycombe
				Stadium: Adams Park

8 August 1996 Oxford Benevolent Cup	Oxford United	2–1	Southampton	Oxford
			Le Tissier	Stadium: Manor Ground

11 August 1996 Friendly	PAOK	2–0	Southampton	Thessaloniki, Greece
				Stadium: PAOK Stadium

== FA Premier League ==
Southampton had a dreadful start to the 1996–97 season, dropping into the relegation zone immediately after failing to pick up a win in their first seven fixtures. After an opening day goalless draw at home to Chelsea, the Saints lost 1–2 at both Leicester City and West Ham United, reduced to ten men in each game as Barry Venison and Francis Benali, respectively, were sent off. Another home draw, 2–2 against Nottingham Forest (the point saved by a last-minute Matt Le Tissier goal), was followed by three straight defeats which saw the South Coast side descend into the drop zone – they lost 1–2 at Liverpool thanks to a goal in the last minute from Steve McManaman, lost 0–1 at home to Tottenham Hotspur thanks to a Chris Armstrong penalty, and went down 1–3 at a high-flying Wimbledon side.

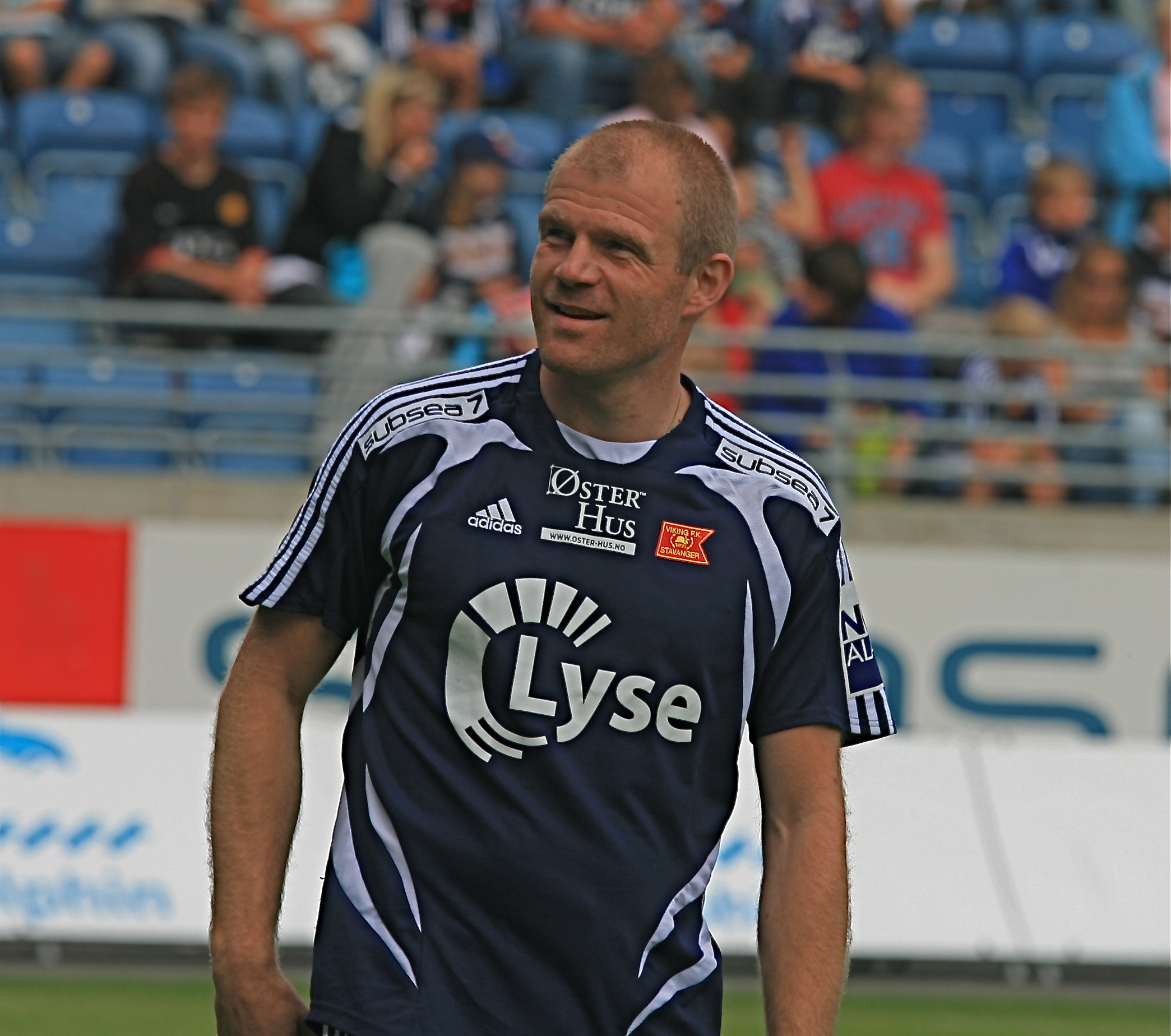
Egil Østenstad joined in October and finished as the season's second-highest scorer, winning the Southampton F.C. Player of the Season award.

After this dreadful start, Southampton picked up their first – and biggest – win of the season, when they beat Middlesbrough 4–0 at home (their joint-biggest win in the FA Premier League since August 1993). Matt Oakley scored his first league goal for the club to open the scoring, before a Matt Le Tissier brace either side of half-time and a Gordon Watson strike late on secured the three points. This started a short unbeaten run of five games which continued with a 1–1 draw at Coventry City (in which new signings Egil Østenstad and Eyal Berkovic made their debuts) and a 3–0 win at home to recently-promoted Sunderland (featuring another debut, for centre-back Ulrich van Gobbel). A week after the win, Southampton hosted FA Premier League champions Manchester United, who they beat 6–3 in "humiliating" fashion. Berkovic opened the scoring after just six minutes with his first goal for the club, before Roy Keane was sent off for United just 15 minutes later, having picked up two bookings for fouls on Southampton players. The hosts took advantage and were 3–1 up by half-time courtesy of Le Tissier and Østenstad, who scored his first goal for the club on the stroke of the break. In the last ten minutes, Berkovic and Østenstad scored again to secure the win – the final goal of the game was initially credited to Østenstad, completing his hat-trick, although it was later judged to be a Gary Neville own goal.

On the back of picking up three wins in five games, Southampton suffered their heaviest defeat since October 1985 at the beginning of November when they lost 1–7 to Everton at Goodison Park, with Gary Speed scoring a hat-trick for the hosts. The following week, the Saints lost 0–2 at home to fellow bottom-half side Leeds United. This game became infamous in the history of the club, as it marked the debut and sole appearance of Ali Dia, who Souness signed on a short-term basis of a fraudulent recommendation he received over the phone. With many of the team's attacking players unavailable due to injury, Dia was brought on when Le Tissier went off with an injury in the 32nd minute; he played most of the remainder of the game, before being substituted off again in the last five minutes. Dia's sole appearance before he was released within just two weeks was described by BBC Sport as "disastrous". Three more defeats followed in a run of five straight losses: 1–2 at Blackburn Rovers, 1–3 at Arsenal, and 0–1 at home to Aston Villa.

Southampton ended 1996 with a 3–1 win over recently-promoted Derby County, followed by two more defeats against top sides Tottenham Hotspur and Liverpool which saw them drop back into the relegation zone – where they would remain for several months. January started with a 1–0 win over Middlesbrough, when Jim Magilton converted a second-half penalty, which was followed by a 2–2 draw at home to Newcastle United in which Le Tissier scored a "25-yard blockbuster" in the last minute to save his side a point. The club remained in the bottom three when they sacrificed winning positions in games against Manchester United (losing 1–2 from a 1–0 lead after ten minutes) and Sheffield Wednesday (losing 2–3 after leading 2–0 at half-time), and were held to draws by Wimbledon, Everton and Leeds United between February and March (the Saints picked up just one win during this run, 1–0 over Newcastle United). Towards the end of March, the club dropped from 19th to 20th (bottom) in the FA Premier League table.

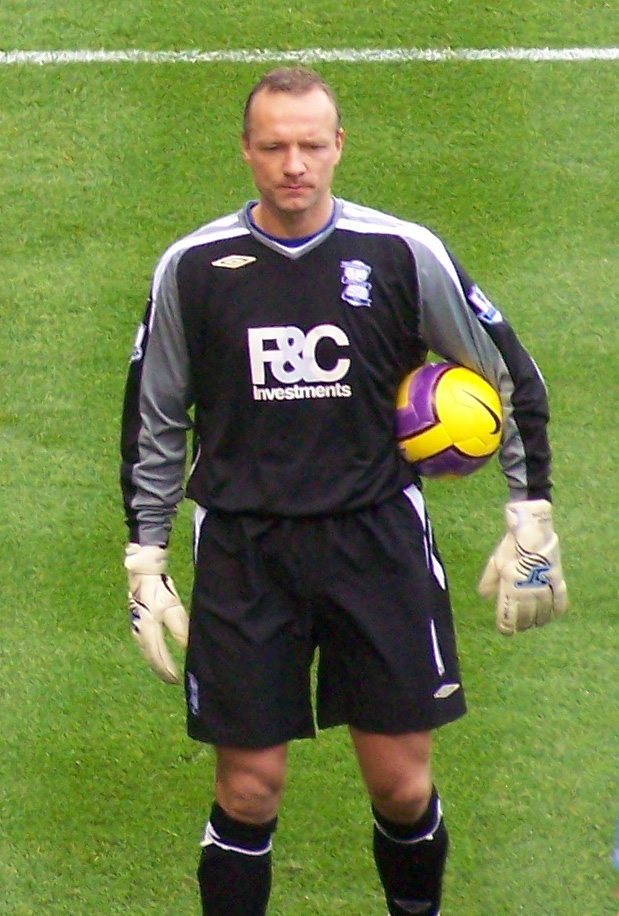
Maik Taylor signed at the end of 1996 and played in goal for the last 18 league games.

Southampton responded to their drop to the bottom of the table with a run of seven games unbeaten, including four crucial "six-pointers" against other sides fighting against the risk of relegation. The first win came at the home of Nottingham Forest on 5 April, when new signing Mickey Evans scored his first two goals for the club since arriving the month before, to help the Saints secure a 3–1 win. After a late-fought 1–1 draw with Derby County, the second win of the run came in a 2–0 home win over West Ham United, with Evans scoring again (followed by Berkovic before half-time). The result saw Southampton climb out of the drop zone, into 16th place, for the first time since December. After dropping a 2–0 lead to draw 2–2 at home to Coventry City, the Saints won again when they picked up a 1–0 win over 18th-placed Sunderland, which was followed a couple of weeks later by a 2–0 win over Blackburn Rovers, the latter of which included Matt Le Tissier's first goal in nine games. Like his predecessor Dave Merrington, Souness was named Premier League Manager of the Month for April after an unbeaten month which saw his club secure a chance at FA Premier League survival with three wins and two draws.

The Saints went into their final game of the season, against 5th-place Aston Villa, needing either Middlesbrough and/or Sunderland to lose in order to ensure their safety. The game ended 1–0 to Villa, with Richard Dryden scoring a 12th-minute own goal to decide the tie, while Middlesbrough drew 1–1 with Leeds United and Sunderland lost 0–1 at Wimbledon, leaving Southampton in 16th place, one point above the relegation spots. This marked the fourth time in five seasons the club had finished their season within a point of the first relegation place, with results on the final day of the campaign deciding their fate. Club historians have noted the importance of the signing of Mickey Evans in the closing stages of the season, as he scored four goals in three key games to keep the side's hopes of FA Premier League survival alive.

=== List of match results ===
18 August 1996 1	Southampton	0–0	Chelsea	Southampton
16:00 BST	Dodd (yellow card); Le Tissier (yellow card)	Report	Morris (yellow card); Wise (yellow card)	Stadium: The Dell; Attendance: 15,186; Referee: Martin Bodenham

21 August 1996 2	Leicester City	2–1	Southampton	Leicester
19:45 BST	Heskey 6', 42'; Lennon (yellow card)	Report	Le Tissier 68' (pen.), (yellow card); Venison (yellow card) (yellow-red card) 82'; Dodd (yellow card); Dryden (yellow card)	Stadium: Filbert Street; Attendance: 17,562; Referee: Mike Riley

24 August 1996 3	West Ham United	2–1	Southampton	London
15:00 BST	Hughes 73'; Dicks 81' (pen.); Bowen (yellow card)	Report	Heaney 19'; Benali (yellow card) (yellow-red card) 83'; Charlton (yellow card)	Stadium: Boleyn Ground; Attendance: 21,227; Referee: David Elleray

4 September 1996 4	Southampton	2–2	Nottingham Forest	Southampton
19:30 BST	Dryden 53'; Le Tissier 89'; Heaney (yellow card)	Report	Campbell 4', (yellow card) 72'; Saunders 23'; Jerkan (yellow card); Pearce (yellow card)	Stadium: The Dell; Attendance: 14,450; Referee: Paul Danson

7 September 1996 5	Liverpool	2–1	Southampton	Liverpool
15:00 BST	Collymore 39'; McManaman 89'; Bjørnebye (yellow card)	Report	Magilton 58'; Dryden (yellow card); Maddison (yellow card); Slater (yellow card)	Stadium: Anfield; Attendance: 39,189; Referee: Alan Wilkie

14 September 1996 6	Southampton	0–1	Tottenham Hotspur	Southampton
15:00 BST	Le Tissier (yellow card); Monkou (yellow card)	Report	Armstrong 66' (pen.); Edinburgh (yellow card); Howells (yellow card)	Stadium: The Dell; Attendance: 15,251; Referee: Paul Alcock

23 September 1996 7	Wimbledon	3–1	Southampton	London
20:00 BST	Gayle 12', (yellow card); Ekoku 38', 73', (yellow card); Kimble (yellow card)	Report	Oakley 77'; Dryden (yellow card); Monkou (yellow card)	Stadium: Selhurst Park; Attendance: 8,562; Referee: Paul Durkin

28 September 1996 8	Southampton	4–0	Middlesbrough	Southampton
15:00 BST	Oakley 11'; Le Tissier 29', 48'; Watson 82'; Lundekvam (yellow card)	Report	Juninho (yellow card); Whelan (yellow card)	Stadium: The Dell; Attendance: 15,230; Referee: Roger Dilkes

13 October 1996 9	Coventry City	1–1	Southampton	Coventry
16:00 BST	Borrows (yellow card) 49'; Williams (yellow card) 53'; Dublin 90'	Report	Le Tissier 17'; Dryden (yellow card); Neilson (yellow card)	Stadium: Highfield Road; Attendance: 15,485; Referee: Paul Durkin

19 October 1996 10	Southampton	3–0	Sunderland	Southampton
15:00 BST	Dodd 38'; Le Tissier 53' (pen.), (yellow card) 58'; Shipperley 89'; Berkovic (yellow card); Lundekvam (yellow card)	Report		Stadium: The Dell; Attendance: 15,225; Referee: Gary Willard

26 October 1996 11	Southampton	6–3	Manchester United	Southampton
15:00 BST	Berkovic 6', 83'; Le Tissier 35'; Østenstad 45', 85'; G. Neville 89' (o.g.); Lundekvam (yellow card)	Report	Keane (yellow card) 6' (yellow-red card) 21'; Cantona (yellow card) 18'; Cruyff (yellow card) 40'; Beckham 41'; May 56'; G. Neville (yellow card) 81'; Scholes 89'	Stadium: The Dell; Attendance: 15,253; Referee: Jeff Winter

2 November 1996 12	Sheffield Wednesday	1–1	Southampton	Sheffield
15:00 GMT	Newsome 14', (yellow card)	Report	Le Tissier 50' (pen.) van Gobbel (yellow card)	Stadium: Hillsborough Stadium; Attendance: 20,106; Referee: Alan Wilkie

16 November 1996 13	Everton	7–1	Southampton	Liverpool
15:00 GMT	Stuart 12'; Kanchelskis 22', 35'; Speed 30', 32', 72'; Barmby 57'	Report	Østenstad 39'	Stadium: Goodison Park; Attendance: 35,669; Referee: Mike Riley

23 November 1996 14	Southampton	0–2	Leeds United	Southampton
15:00 GMT	van Gobbel (yellow card)	Report	Ford (yellow card) 69'; Kelly 82'; Sharpe 89'; Beesley (yellow card)	Stadium: The Dell; Attendance: 15,241; Referee: Keith Burge

30 November 1996 15	Blackburn Rovers	2–1	Southampton	Blackburn
15:00 GMT	Sherwood 27'; Sutton 87', (yellow card); Wilcox (yellow card)	Report	Maddison (yellow card) 58'; Østenstad 61' van Gobbel (yellow card) (yellow-red card) 81'; Monkou (yellow card)	Stadium: Ewood Park; Attendance: 23,018; Referee: Roger Dilkes

4 December 1996 16	Arsenal	3–1	Southampton	London
19:45 GMT	Merson 43'; Wright 57' (pen.); Shaw 89'; Vieira (yellow card)	Report	Berkovic 81'; Charlton (yellow card); Lundekvam (yellow card)	Stadium: Arsenal Stadium; Attendance: 38,033; Referee: Peter Jones

7 December 1996 17	Southampton	0–1	Aston Villa	Southampton
15:00 GMT	van Gobbel (yellow card)	Report	Townsend 34'; Milošević (yellow card) 53'; Draper (yellow card); Staunton (yellow card); Taylor (yellow card)	Stadium: The Dell; Attendance: 15,232; Referee: Stephen Lodge

21 December 1996 18	Southampton	3–1	Derby County	Southampton
15:00 GMT	Watson 9'; Oakley 13'; Magilton 89' (pen.); Benali (yellow card); Slater (yellow card)	Report	Dailly 8'; Gabbiadini (yellow card); Rowett (yellow card)	Stadium: The Dell; Attendance: 14,901; Referee: Paul Danson

26 December 1996 19	Tottenham Hotspur	3–1	Southampton	London
12:00 GMT	Iversen 1', 30'; Nielsen 64'	Report	Le Tissier 40'; Neilson (yellow card); Slater (yellow card) van Gobbel (yellow card)	Stadium: White Hart Lane; Attendance: 30,549; Referee: Graham Barber

29 December 1996 20	Southampton	0–1	Liverpool	Southampton
16:00 GMT	Maddison (yellow card)	Report	Barnes 76'; Thomas (yellow card)	Stadium: The Dell; Attendance: 15,222; Referee: Steve Dunn

11 January 1997 21	Middlesbrough	0–1	Southampton	Middlesbrough
15:00 GMT	Blackmore (yellow card) (yellow-red card) 58'; Cox (yellow card); Emerson (yellow card); Hignett (yellow card)	Report	Magilton 59' (pen.); Berkovic (yellow card) 70'; Monkou (yellow card); Taylor (yellow card) van Gobbel (yellow card)	Stadium: Riverside Stadium; Attendance: 29,509; Referee: Gerald Ashby

18 January 1997 22	Southampton	2–2	Newcastle United	Southampton
15:00 GMT	Hughes (yellow card) 35'; Maddison 88'; Le Tissier 89'	Report	Ferdinand 14', (yellow card); Clark 82'; Beresford (yellow card); Elliott (yellow card)	Stadium: The Dell; Attendance: 15,251; Referee: Mike Reed

1 February 1997 23	Manchester United	2–1	Southampton	Manchester
15:00 GMT	Pallister 19'; Poborský (yellow card) 73'; Cantona 80'	Report	Østenstad 11', (yellow card); Berkovic (yellow card) 70'; Dryden (yellow card); Le Tissier (yellow card)	Stadium: Old Trafford; Attendance: 55,269; Referee: Mike Riley

22 February 1997 24	Southampton	2–3	Sheffield Wednesday	Southampton
15:00 GMT	Østenstad 28'; Le Tissier 33' (pen.) van Gobbel 65'; Monkou (yellow card)	Report	Blinker (yellow card) 43'; Hirst 49', 55'; Booth 78'; Carbone (yellow card) 88'; Atherton (yellow card); Pembridge (yellow card)	Stadium: The Dell; Attendance: 15,062; Referee: Mike Reed

26 February 1997 25	Southampton	0–0	Wimbledon	Southampton
19:30 GMT		Report		Stadium: The Dell; Attendance: 14,418; Referee: Alan Wilkie

1 March 1997 26	Newcastle United	0–1	Southampton	Newcastle upon Tyne
15:00 GMT	Asprilla (yellow card)	Report	Le Tissier 56'; Magilton (yellow card); Neilson (yellow card) van Gobbel (yellow card)	Stadium: St James' Park; Attendance: 36,446; Referee: Martin Bodenham

5 March 1997 27	Southampton	2–2	Everton	Southampton
19:30 GMT	Slater 59'; Short 61' (o.g.)	Report	Ferguson 11'; Speed 27', (yellow card)	Stadium: The Dell; Attendance: 15,134; Referee: Paul Durkin

12 March 1997 28	Leeds United	0–0	Southampton	Leeds
19:45 GMT		Report	Lundekvam (yellow card); Maddison (yellow card)	Stadium: Elland Road; Attendance: 25,913; Referee: Gerald Ashby

15 March 1997 29	Southampton	0–2	Arsenal	Southampton
15:00 GMT	Monkou (yellow card) 37'; Slater (yellow card)	Report	Hughes 41'; Shaw 72'; Parlour (yellow card); Vieira (yellow card); Winterburn (yellow card)	Stadium: The Dell; Attendance: 15,144; Referee: Jeff Winter

19 March 1997 30	Chelsea	1–0	Southampton	London
19:45 GMT	Zola 22'; Sinclair (yellow card)	Report	Benali (yellow card) 12' van Gobbel (yellow card)	Stadium: Stamford Bridge; Attendance: 28,079; Referee: Stephen Lodge

22 March 1997 31	Southampton	2–2	Leicester City	Southampton
15:00 GMT	Østenstad 32', (yellow card) 74' van Gobbel 48'	Report	Heskey 46'; Neilson 70' (o.g.); Walsh (yellow card)	Stadium: The Dell; Attendance: 15,044; Referee: Keith Burge

5 April 1997 32	Nottingham Forest	1–3	Southampton	Nottingham
15:00 BST	Pearce 88' (pen.) van Hooijdonk (yellow card)	Report	Magilton 8', (yellow card); Evans 87', 89'; Benali (yellow card)	Stadium: City Ground; Attendance: 25,134; Referee: Alan Wilkie

9 April 1997 33	Derby County	1–1	Southampton	Derby
19:45 BST	Ward 66'; Trollope (yellow card)	Report	Powell 90' (o.g.); Berkovic (yellow card)	Stadium: Baseball Ground; Attendance: 17,839; Referee: Gary Willard

12 April 1997 34	Southampton	2–0	West Ham United	Southampton
15:00 BST	Evans 13', (yellow card); Berkovic 36'; Dodd (yellow card) 43' (red card)	Report	Rowland (yellow card) 78'; Bilić (yellow card)	Stadium: The Dell; Attendance: 15,244; Referee: Steve Dunn

19 April 1997 35	Southampton	2–2	Coventry City	Southampton
15:00 BST	Neilson (yellow card) 14'; Evans 27'; Østenstad 47', (yellow card); Magilton (yellow card)	Report	Ndlovu 62'; Whelan 74'; Burrows (yellow card); Huckerby (yellow card); Shaw (yellow card)	Stadium: The Dell; Attendance: 15,251; Referee: Peter Jones

22 April 1997 36	Sunderland	0–1	Southampton	Sunderland
19:45 BST		Report	Østenstad 22'	Stadium: Roker Park; Attendance: 21,521; Referee: Mike Riley

3 May 1997 37	Southampton	2–0	Blackburn Rovers	Southampton
15:00 BST	Slater 22', (yellow card); Le Tissier 74' van Gobbel (yellow card)	Report	Sherwood (yellow card) (yellow-red card) 73'; McKinlay (yellow card)	Stadium: The Dell; Attendance: 15,247; Referee: Gerald Ashby

11 May 1997 38	Aston Villa	1–0	Southampton	Birmingham
16:00 BST	Dryden 12' (o.g.)	Report		Stadium: Villa Park; Attendance: 39,339; Referee: Gary Willard

=== Final league table ===
Pos	Team	Pld	W	D	L	GF	GA	GD	Pts	Qualification or relegation
14	West Ham United	38	10	12	16	39	48	−9	42	
15	Everton	38	10	12	16	44	57	−13	42	
16	Southampton	38	10	11	17	50	56	−6	41	
17	Coventry City	38	9	14	15	38	54	−16	41	
18	Sunderland (R)	38	10	10	18	35	53	−18	40	Relegation to the Football League First Division

Source: RSSSF
Rules for classification: 1) points; 2) goal difference; 3) number of goals scored.
(R) Relegated

=== Results by matchday ===
Round	1	2	3	4	5	6	7	8	9	10	11	12	13	14	15	16	17	18	19	20	21	22	23	24	25	26	27	28	29	30	31	32	33	34	35	36	37	38
Ground	H	A	A	H	A	H	A	H	A	H	H	A	A	H	A	A	H	H	A	H	A	H	A	H	H	A	H	A	H	A	H	A	A	H	H	A	H	A
Result	D	L	L	D	L	L	L	W	D	W	W	D	L	L	L	L	L	W	L	L	W	D	L	L	D	W	D	D	L	L	D	W	D	W	D	W	W	L
Position	13	15	17	18	18	19	19	18	18	17	14	14	14	17	17	17	18	16	19	19	19	18	19	19	19	19	18	19	19	20	20	19	19	16	17	15	14	16

Source: 11v11.com
A = Away; H = Home; W = Win; D = Draw; L = Loss

== FA Cup ==
Southampton entered the 1996–97 FA Cup in the third round against Reading, who were struggling in the lower places of the First Division, and by whom the Saints had been eliminated from the League Cup the previous year. Despite an early start in which they looked more likely to score, it was the top-flight visitors who suffered the first setback of the game when Reading broke the deadlock in the 19th minute through Jamie Lambert. After the half-time break, the Saints drew level when Egil Østenstad "held off three defenders" to equalise after being set up by Eyal Berkovic. Reading were back in front within six minutes though, when Darren Caskey volleyed in a header from Trevor Morley. Lambert doubled his tally and made it 3–1 for the hosts late on, when he converted a penalty given for a foul by Francis Benali (for which he was sent off). In the last minute of the game, Southampton were reduced to nine men as Robbie Slater was also sent off, after making a "gesture" to the linesman.

4 January 1997 Round 3	Reading	3–1	Southampton	Reading
	Lambert 19', 77' (pen.); Caskey 54'; Holsgrove (yellow card)		Østenstad 49'; Benali (red card) 75'; Slater (red card) 90'	Stadium: Elm Park; Attendance: 11,537; Referee: Graham Poll

== League Cup ==
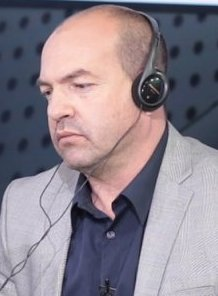
Eyal Berkovic scored two of his six goals during his loan spell at Southampton in the League Cup third and fourth rounds.

Southampton entered the 1996–97 League Cup in the second round against Second Division strugglers Peterborough United. In the first leg, at The Dell, the top-flight hosts won 2–0 thanks to goals in either half from Matt Le Tissier (a 20th-minute left-footer) and Gordon Watson (a chip from a Claus Lundekvam cross in the 81st minute). The Saints fared even better in the second leg at London Road Stadium, winning 4–0 to take their aggregate win to 6–1. Watson opened the scoring just after the half-hour mark with a volley from a Le Tissier free kick, with Simon Charlton doubling the lead before the break with a volley from a Robbie Slater cross. David Farrell pulled one back for the hosts five minutes into the second half, before long-range shots from Jim Magilton and Richard Dryden extended Southampton's lead as they progressed to the next round.

In the third round, Southampton hosted Third Division side Lincoln City, who were playing in the third round for the first time since the 1982–83 season. Despite the gulf between their league standings, it was the fourth-tier side who went into half-time with the advantage, after Mark Hone put them 1–0 up in the 21st minute. Straight after the break, Le Tissier equalised with a 30-yard volley, before centre-back Ulrich van Gobbel scored his first goal for the club with a header eight minutes later. In the final five minutes, Lincoln forced a replay when Gareth Ainsworth scored a second for the team. In the replay at Sincil Bank, Ainsworth put the hosts in front after just nine minutes, with the lead lasting through half-time until the late stages of the game. It took until the 75th minute for the Saints to equalise, when Magilton scored a penalty given for a foul on Egil Østenstad, which was followed ten minutes later by Watson from a Jason Dodd cross for 2–1, and in the last minute by a long-range Eyal Berkovic effort for 3–1.

Southampton were drawn against First Division club Oxford United in the fourth round, this time away. Dryden put the top-flight visitors ahead in the 26th minute for what appeared to be a winner, before former Saint Paul Moody scored in the last minute of the game to force a replay. The replay at The Dell was an evenly-fought affair, with Berkovic's 21st-minute opener matched by an equaliser just before the break from Oxford's Nigel Jemson. Shortly after the break, Dryden scored his third goal of the tournament to put the Saints 2–1 up, before Egil Østenstad made it 3–1 just before the hour mark. Bobby Ford scored another for Oxford straight after Østenstad's goal, but his side were unable to break the deadlock further and were eliminated.

In the fifth round, Southampton were hosted by Stockport County, another Second Division side. Despite opening the scoring through Østenstad in the 16th minute, the top-flight Saints went into half-time 1–2 down, after Alun Armstrong and Luís Cavaco scored in quick succession in the 25th and 26th minutes, respectively. Stockport held onto their lead until the last five minutes, when Østenstad scored his – and Southampton's – second to force a replay for a third round in a row. At The Dell, Le Tissier opened the scoring for Southampton after just eight minutes, however the hosts were "outplayed" and conceded twice in the second half – through Brett Angell and Andy Mutch – to face elimination.

18 September 1996 Round 2 Leg 1	Southampton	2–0	Peterborough United	Southampton
	Le Tissier 20'; Watson 81'			Stadium: The Dell; Attendance: 12,467

25 September 1996 Round 2 Leg 2	Peterborough United	1–4 (1–6 agg.)	Southampton	Peterborough
	Farrell 50'		Watson 32'; Charlton 35'; Magilton 55'; Dryden 78'	Stadium: London Road Stadium; Attendance: 8,220

23 October 1996 Round 3	Southampton	2–2	Lincoln City	Southampton
	Hone 21'; Ainsworth 86'		Le Tissier 46' van Gobbel 54'	Stadium: The Dell; Attendance: 14,516

12 November 1996 Round 3 Replay	Lincoln City	1–3	Southampton	Lincoln
	Ainsworth 9'		Magilton 75' (pen.); Watson 85'; Berkovic 90'	Stadium: Sincil Bank; Attendance: 10,523

26 November 1996 Round 4	Oxford United	1–1	Southampton	Oxford
	Moody 90'		Dryden 26'	Stadium: Manor Ground; Attendance: 9,473

18 December 1996 Round 4 Replay	Southampton	3–2	Oxford United	Southampton
	Berkovic 21'; Dryden 52'; Østenstad 58'		Jemson 42'; B. Ford 58'	Stadium: The Dell; Attendance: 10,737

22 January 1997 Round 5	Stockport County	2–2	Southampton	Stockport
	Armstrong 25'; Cavaco 26'		Østenstad 16', 85'	Stadium: Edgeley Park; Attendance: 9,840

29 January 1997 Round 5 Replay	Southampton	1–2	Stockport County	Southampton
	Le Tissier 8'		Angell 62'; Mutch 83'	Stadium: The Dell; Attendance: 13,428

== Other matches ==
Outside the league and cup competitions, Southampton played three additional matches during the second half of the 1996–97 season. The first two, in February and March, saw the Saints lose at two Second Division clubs: 0–2 at Brentford and 1–2 at Bournemouth. The final game took place two days after the conclusion of the league season and saw the club's current first team take on a side of "ex Saints" for defender Francis Benali's testimonial. The game finished in a 7–7 draw, with Benali scoring alongside goalkeeper Dave Beasant, who netted twice.

14 February 1997 Friendly	Brentford	2–0	Southampton	London
				Stadium: Griffin Park

7 March 1997 Friendly	Bournemouth	2–1	Southampton	Bournemouth
			Mickey Evans	Stadium: Dean Court

13 May 1997 Francis Benali Testimonial	Southampton	7–7	Ex-Saints	Southampton
	Basham; Beasant; Benali; Berkovic; Dowie; Magilton			Stadium: The Dell

== Player details ==
Southampton used 31 players during the 1996–97 season, 15 of whom scored during the campaign. 14 players made their debut appearances for the club, including 12 of their 13 first team signings (Eyal Berkovic, Ali Dia, Richard Dryden, Mickey Evans, Claus Lundekvam, Egil Østenstad, Graham Potter, Robbie Slater, Maik Taylor, Ulrich van Gobbel, Russell Watkinson, and Chris Woods), one signing from the previous season (Neil Moss), and one player making the step up from youth to the first team (Steve Basham). Six of these – Berkovic, Dia, Potter, Taylor, Watkinson, and Woods – also made their last appearances for the Saints during the campaign, as did mid-season departees Frankie Bennett, Neil Heaney, Neil Shipperley, and Gordon Watson, plus two players sold the next season (Dave Beasant and Christer Warren), and one player who subsequently retired (Barry Venison). Midfielder Jim Magilton made the most appearances for Southampton during the season, as he had the one before, playing in 46 of the team's 47 games. Matt Le Tissier finished as the club's top goalscorer for the sixth time in the last eight seasons, with 13 goals in the league and three in the League Cup. Østenstad, who finished second in the goalscoring charts with 13 total goals (nine in the league, one in the FA Cup and three in the League Cup), won the Southampton F.C. Player of the Season award for 1996–97.

=== Squad statistics ===
No.	Name	Pos.	Nat.	League		FA Cup		League Cup		Total		Discipline	
No.	Name	Pos.	Nat.	Apps.	Goals	Apps.	Goals	Apps.	Goals	Apps.	Goals	Yellow card	Red card
1	Dave Beasant	GK	(England)	13(1)	0	1	0	4	0	18(1)	0	0	0
2	Jason Dodd	DF	(England)	23	1	0	0	3	0	26	1	2	1
3	Francis Benali	DF	(England)	14(4)	0	1	0	0	0	15(4)	0	4	2
4	Jim Magilton	MF	(Northern Ireland)	31(6)	4	1	0	6(2)	2	38(8)	5	3	0
6	Ken Monkou	DF	(Netherlands)	8(5)	0	0	0	5(1)	0	13(6)	0	6	0
7	Matt Le Tissier	MF	(England)	25(6)	13	1	0	6	3	32(6)	16	5	0
8	Mickey Evans	FW	(Republic of Ireland)	8(4)	4	0	0	0	0	8(4)	4	1	0
10	Neil Maddison	MF	(England)	14(4)	1	1	0	2(2)	0	17(6)	1	4	0
13	Neil Moss	GK	(England)	3	0	0	0	2	0	5	0	0	0
14	Simon Charlton	DF	(England)	24(3)	0	0(1)	0	5(1)	1	29(5)	1	2	0
15	Alan Neilson	DF	(Wales)	24(5)	0	0	0	5	0	29(5)	0	3	0
16	David Hughes	MF	(England)	1(5)	0	0	0	1(1)	0	2(6)	0	1	0
17	Paul Tisdale	MF	(England)	0	0	0	0	0	0	0	0	0	0
18	Matt Oakley	MF	(England)	23(5)	3	0(1)	0	6(1)	0	29(7)	3	0	0
19	Richard Dryden	DF	(England)	28(1)	1	0	0	6	3	34(1)	4	5	0
20	Robbie Slater	MF	(Australia)	22(8)	2	1	0	5(2)	0	28(10)	2	5	1
22	Claus Lundekvam	DF	(Norway)	28(1)	0	1	0	7(1)	0	36(2)	0	5	0
23	Darryl Flahavan	GK	(England)	0	0	0	0	0	0	0	0	0	0
25	Paul Sheerin	MF	(Scotland)	0	0	0	0	0	0	0	0	0	0
26	Matthew Robinson	DF	(England)	3(4)	0	1	0	0	0	4(4)	0	0	0
27	Steve Basham	FW	(England)	1(5)	0	0	0	0	0	1(5)	0	0	0
28	Russell Watkinson	FW	(England)	0(2)	0	0	0	0(1)	0	0(3)	0	0	0
29	Eyal Berkovic	MF	(Israel)	26(2)	4	1	0	5(1)	2	32(3)	6	4	0
30	Egil Østenstad	FW	(Norway)	29(1)	9	1	1	6	3	36(1)	13	3	0
32	Ulrich van Gobbel	DF	(Netherlands)	24(1)	1	1	0	6	1	31(1)	2	9	1
33	Maik Taylor	GK	(Northern Ireland)	18	0	0	0	0	0	18	0	1	0
Squad members who left before the end of the season
8	Gordon Watson	FW	(England)	7(8)	2	0(1)	0	4(2)	3	11(11)	5	0	0
9	Neil Shipperley	FW	(England)	9(1)	1	0	0	1(1)	0	10(2)	1	0	0
11	Neil Heaney	MF	(England)	4(4)	1	0	0	0	0	4(4)	1	1	0
12	Graham Potter	DF	(England)	2(6)	0	0	0	1(1)	0	3(7)	0	0	0
21	Frankie Bennett	FW	(England)	0	0	0	0	0	0	0	0	0	0
31	Chris Woods	GK	(England)	4	0	0	0	2	0	6	0	0	0
33	Ali Dia	FW	(Senegal)	0(1)	0	0	0	0	0	0(1)	0	0	0
Squad members who ended the season out on loan
24	Christer Warren	MF	(England)	0(1)	0	0	0	0	0	0(1)	0	0	0
Squad members who retired before the end of the season
5	Barry Venison	DF	(England)	2	0	0	0	0	0	2	0	1	1

=== Most appearances ===
Rank	Name	Pos.	League		FA Cup		League Cup		Total		
Rank	Name	Pos.	Starts	Subs	Starts	Subs	Starts	Subs	Starts	Subs	Total
1	Jim Magilton	MF	31	6	1	0	6	2	38	8	46
2	Claus Lundekvam	DF	28	1	1	0	7	1	36	2	38
2	Matt Le Tissier	MF	25	6	1	0	6	0	32	6	38
2	Robbie Slater	MF	22	8	1	0	5	2	28	10	38
5	Egil Østenstad	FW	29	1	1	0	6	0	36	1	37
6	Matt Oakley	MF	23	5	0	1	6	1	29	7	36
7	Richard Dryden	DF	28	1	0	0	6	0	34	1	35
7	Eyal Berkovic	MF	26	2	1	0	5	1	32	3	35
9	Simon Charlton	DF	24	3	0	1	5	1	29	5	34
9	Alan Neilson	DF	24	5	0	0	5	0	29	5	34

=== Top goalscorers ===
Rank	Name	Pos.	League		FA Cup		League Cup		Total		
Rank	Name	Pos.	Goals	Apps	Goals	Apps	Goals	Apps	Goals	Apps	GPG
1	Matt Le Tissier	MF	13	31	0	1	3	6	16	38	0.42
2	Egil Østenstad	FW	9	30	1	1	3	6	13	37	0.35
3	Eyal Berkovic	MF	4	28	0	1	2	6	6	35	0.17
3	Jim Magilton	MF	4	37	0	1	2	8	6	46	0.13
5	Gordon Watson	FW	2	15	0	1	3	6	5	22	0.23
6	Mickey Evans	FW	4	12	0	0	0	0	4	12	0.33
6	Richard Dryden	DF	1	29	0	0	3	6	4	35	0.11
8	Matt Oakley	MF	3	28	0	1	0	7	3	36	0.08
9	Ulrich van Gobbel	DF	1	25	0	1	1	6	2	32	0.06
9	Robbie Slater	MF	2	30	0	1	0	7	2	38	0.05

== Bibliography ==
- Holley, Duncan; Chalk, Gary (2003), Bull, David (ed.), In That Number: A Post-War Chronicle of Southampton FC, Bristol, England: Hagiology Publishing, ISBN 0-9534474-3-X
