= 1996–97 Stockport County F.C. season =

Stockport County
1996–97 season
- Chairman: Brendan Elwood
- Manager: Dave Jones
- Stadium: Edgeley Park
- Second Division: 2nd (promoted)
- FA Cup: Fourth round
- League Cup: Semi finals
- Football League Trophy: Northern final
- Top goalscorer: League: Angell (15); All: Angell (19)
- Average home league attendance: 6,424
Home colours	Away colours	Third colours

During the 1996–97 English football season, Stockport County F.C. competed in the Football League Second Division.

== Season summary ==
The 1996–97 season proved to be possibly the most memorable in Stockport County's history. The season began in a forgettable fashion however, recording two draws and four defeats in the first six league matches. A 2nd round League Cup tie against Sheffield United proved to be a catalyst, and Stockport won with a 7–3 aggregate win, including a 5–2 victory at Bramall Lane. Although Stockport reached the northern final of the Auto Windscreens Shield, losing 2–0 on aggregate to Carlisle and just missing out on a visit to Wembley, it was the League Cup which provided the major highlights of the season, with four victories over top-flight opposition. The club, in its third colours for the first and only time in the season, recorded a 1–0 win away at Blackburn Rovers in the 3rd round, due to a colour clash with both the home and away kits. This win was followed by a 4th round 1–1 draw away to West Ham and a 2–1 victory in the replay at Edgeley Park, a quarter final 2–2 draw against Southampton at Edgeley Park followed by a 2–1 victory in the replay at The Dell, and then a semi-final meeting with Middlesbrough. Although County lost the first leg at Edgeley Park 2–0, they won 1–0 at the Riverside Stadium, failing to convert several chances to equalise on aggregate.

After a disappointing start, Stockport also enjoyed a great league campaign, eventually securing promotion from Division Two with a 1–0 victory at Chesterfield in the penultimate match of the season. Had Stockport failed to win the game they would have faced a deciding match away at promotion rivals Luton Town on the final day of the season. As it turned out, County travelled to Kenilworth Road with a chance to win the title, but a 1–1 draw meant that local rivals Bury finished top of the table with Stockport finishing second.

== Final league table ==
Pos	Team	Pld	W	D	L	GF	GA	GD	Pts	Promotion or relegation
1	Bury (C, P)	46	24	12	10	62	38	+24	84	Promotion to the First Division
2	Stockport County (P)	46	23	13	10	59	41	+18	82	Promotion to the First Division
3	Luton Town	46	21	15	10	71	45	+26	78	Qualification for the Second Division play-offs
4	Brentford	46	20	14	12	56	43	+13	74	Qualification for the Second Division play-offs
5	Bristol City	46	21	10	15	69	51	+18	73	Qualification for the Second Division play-offs

Rules for classification: In the Football League goals scored (GF) takes precedence over goal difference (GD).
(C) Champions; (P) Promoted

== Results ==
Stockport County's score comes first

=== Legend ===
Win	Draw	Loss

=== Football League Second Division ===
Date	Opponent	Venue	Result	Attendance	Scorers
17 August 1996	Crewe Alexandra	A	0–1	4,310	
24 August 1996	Notts County	H	0–0	5,271	
27 August 1996	Bournemouth	H	0–1	3,446	
31 August 1996	Bristol Rovers	A	1–1	6,380	Jeffers
7 September 1996	Watford	A	0–1	7,208	
10 September 1996	Wrexham	H	0–2	4,244	
14 September 1996	Plymouth Argyle	H	3–1	5,087	Gannon (2), Armstrong
21 September 1996	York City	A	2–1	3,061	Angell (2)
28 September 1996	Gillingham	H	2–1	6,049	Armstrong, Morris (own goal)
2 October 1996	Millwall	A	4–3	7,537	Durkan, Armstrong (2), Gannon
5 October 1996	Burnley	A	2–5	10,332	Angell, Mutch
12 October 1996	Preston North End	H	1–0	8,405	Angell
15 October 1996	Luton Town	H	1–1	5,352	Angell
19 October 1996	Wycombe Wanderers	A	2–0	4,017	Angell (2)
26 October 1996	Walsall	A	1–1	3,767	Durkan
29 October 1996	Chesterfield	H	1–0	4,831	Dinning
2 November 1996	Bristol City	H	1–1	6,654	Bennett
9 November 1996	Brentford	A	2–2	5,076	Angell, Cavaco
19 November 1996	Blackpool	H	1–0	4,572	Bennett
23 November 1996	Shrewsbury Town	A	2–3	2,865	Angell, Marsden
30 November 1996	Walsall	H	2–0	5,333	Angell (2)
3 December 1996	Rotherham United	A	1–0	2,133	Durkan
14 December 1996	Peterborough United	H	0–0	5,748	
21 December 1996	Bury	A	0–0	5,069	
26 December 1996	Wrexham	A	3–2	6,736	Armstrong, Gannon, Dinning (pen)
18 January 1997	Millwall	H	5–1	7,502	Mutch, Armstrong (pen), Flynn, Cavaco (2)
1 February 1997	Brentford	H	1–2	8,650	Cavaco
7 February 1997	Bristol City	A	1–1	13,186	Armstrong
15 February 1997	Shrewsbury Town	H	3–1	6,712	Angell (2), Armstrong
22 February 1997	Blackpool	A	1–2	5,772	Linighan (own goal)
1 March 1997	Rotherham United	H	0–0	6,147	
8 March 1997	Bury	H	2–1	8,170	Mutch, Jeffers
15 March 1997	Peterborough United	A	2–0	4,857	Cavaco, Marsden
22 March 1997	Notts County	A	2–1	4,238	Flynn, Hogg (own goal)
29 March 1997	Crewe Alexandra	H	1–0	7,411	Cooper
1 April 1997	Bournemouth	A	0–0	5,476	
5 April 1997	Bristol Rovers	H	1–0	5,689	Cooper (pen)
8 April 1997	Plymouth Argyle	A	0–0	5,089	
12 April 1997	Burnley	H	1–0	9,187	Mutch
14 April 1997	Watford	H	1–0	7,164	Jeffers
16 April 1997	Gillingham	A	0–1	4,485	
19 April 1997	Preston North End	A	0–1	10,298	
22 April 1997	York City	H	2–1	6,654	Bennett, Angell
26 April 1997	Wycombe Wanderers	H	2–1	9,463	Armstrong, Forsyth (own goal)
28 April 1997	Chesterfield	A	1–0	8,690	Angell
3 May 1997	Luton Town	A	1–1	9,347	Cooper (pen)

=== FA Cup ===
Round	Date	Opponent	Venue	Result	Attendance	Goalscorers
R1	16 November 1996	Doncaster Rovers	H	2–1	4,211	Flynn, Mutch
R2	7 December 1996	Mansfield Town	A	3–0	3,354	Kilcline (own goal), Durkan (2)
R3	15 January 1997	Stoke City	A	2–0	9,961	Durkan, Armstrong
R4	25 January 1997	Birmingham City	A	1–3	18,487	Angell

=== League Cup ===
Round	Date	Opponent	Venue	Result	Attendance	Goalscorers
R1 1st Leg	20 August 1996	Chesterfield	H	2–1	3,088	Mutch (2)
R1 2nd Leg	3 September 1996	Chesterfield	A	2–1 (won 4–2 on agg)	3,334	Ware, Mutch
R2 1st Leg	17 September 1996	Sheffield United	H	2–1	4,004	Flynn, Bennett
R2 2nd Leg	24 September 1996	Sheffield United	A	5–2 (won 7–3 on agg)	6,285	Gannon, Armstrong (2), Bennett, Angell
R3	22 October 1996	Blackburn Rovers	A	1–0	14,622	Sherwood (own goal)
R4	27 November 1996	West Ham United	A	1–1	20,061	Cavaco
R4R	18 December 1996	West Ham United	H	2–1	9,834	Dowie (own goal), Angell
QF	22 January 1997	Southampton	H	2–2	9,840	Armstrong, Cavaco
QFR	29 January 1997	Southampton	A	2–1	13,428	Angell, Mutch
SF 1st Leg	26 February 1997	Middlesbrough	H	0–2	11,778	
SF 2nd Leg	12 March 1997	Middlesbrough	A	1–0 (lost 1–2 on agg)	29,633	Connelly

=== Football League Trophy ===
Round	Date	Opponent	Venue	Result	Attendance	Goalscorers
NR1	10 December 1996	Doncaster Rovers	A	2–1	988	
NR2	4 February 1997	Burnley	A	1–0	4,251	
NQF	11 February 1997	Bury	A	2–1 (a.e.t.)	2,497	
NSF	4 March 1997	Crewe Alexandra	A	1–1 (won 5–3 on pens)	3,529	
NF 1st Leg	18 March 1997	Carlisle United	A	0–2	7,057	
NF 2nd Leg	25 March 1997	Carlisle United	H	0–0 (lost 0–2 on agg)	8,593	

== Squad ==
Note: Flags indicate national team as defined under FIFA eligibility rules; some limited exceptions apply. Players may hold more than one non-FIFA nationality.

No.	Pos.	Nation	Player
—	GK	(Wales) WAL	Neil Edwards
—	GK	(Wales) WAL	Paul Jones
—	GK	(England) ENG	Lea Jones
—	DF	(England) ENG	Matthew Bound
—	DF	(England) ENG	Sean Connelly
—	DF	(England) ENG	Jeff Eckhardt
—	DF	(England) ENG	Mike Flynn
—	DF	(England) ENG	Jim Gannon
—	DF	(Wales) WAL	Damon Searle
—	DF	(England) ENG	Lee Todd
—	MF	(Scotland) SCO	Tom Bennett
—	MF	(Portugal) POR	Luís Cavaco
—	MF	(England) ENG	Kevin Cooper (on loan from Derby County)
—	MF	(England) ENG	Gordon Cowans

No.	Pos.	Nation	Player
—	MF	(England) ENG	Tony Dinning
—	MF	(Republic of Ireland) IRL	Kieron Durkan
—	MF	(England) ENG	John Jeffers
—	MF	(England) ENG	Chris Marsden
—	MF	(England) ENG	Lee Marshall
—	MF	(Canada) CAN	Martin Nash
—	MF	(England) ENG	Paul Ware
—	FW	(England) ENG	Brett Angell
—	FW	(England) ENG	Alun Armstrong
—	FW	(Saint Lucia) LCA	Ken Charlery
—	FW	(Portugal) POR	Kiko
—	FW	(England) ENG	Richard Landon
—	FW	(England) ENG	Adie Mike
—	FW	(England) ENG	Andy Mutch
