= Zarelli =

Zarelli is a surname. Notable people with the surname include:

- Joseph Zarelli (born 1961), American politician
- Joseph Augustus Zarelli (1953–1957), American victim of murder

== See also ==
- Alessandro Zarrelli
