= Ulrich van Gobbel =

Surinamese-born Dutch footballer

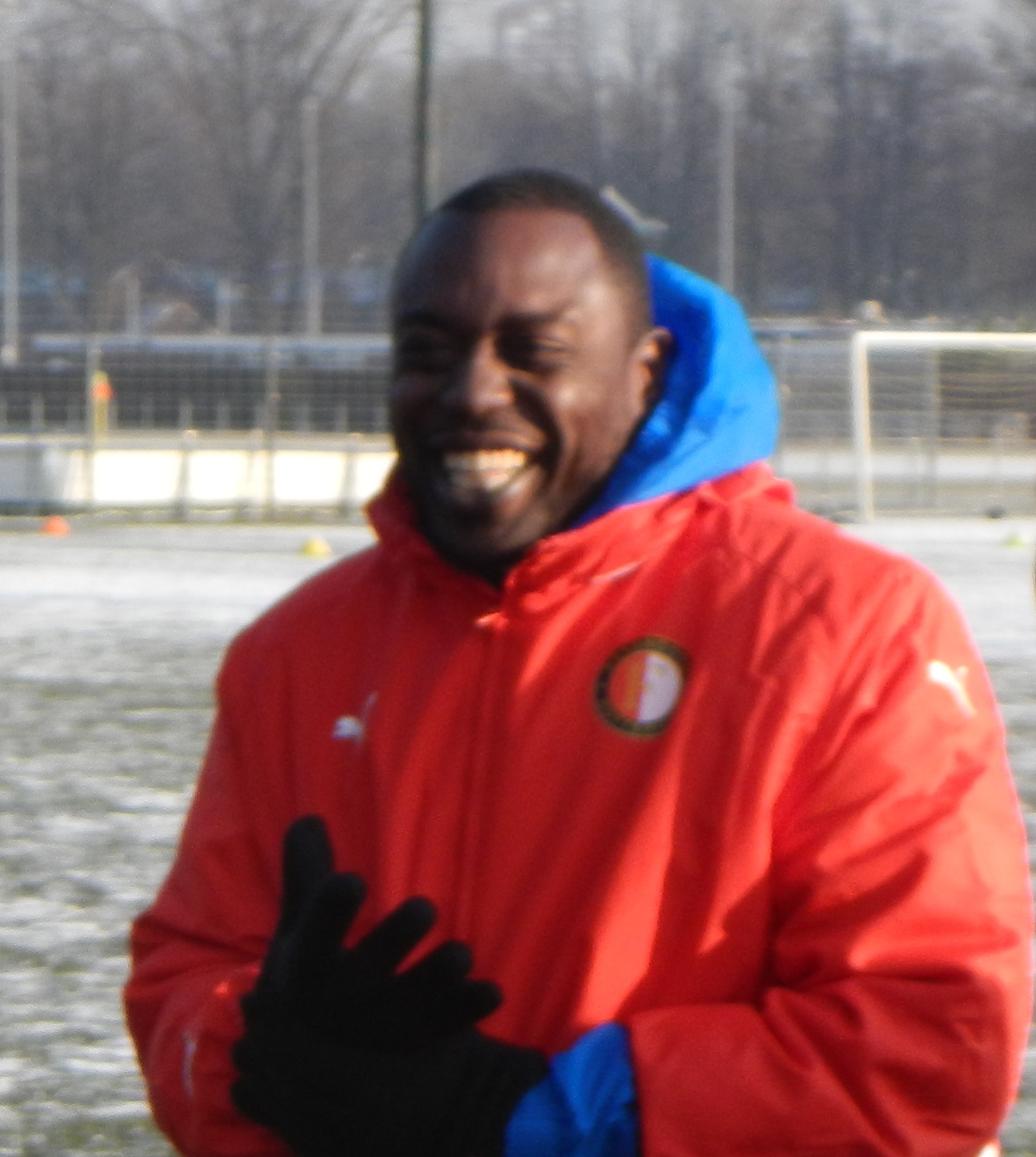

Personal information
- Date of birth: 16 January 1971 (age 55)
- Place of birth: Paramaribo, Suriname (Note: Dutch dependency until 1975)
- Height: 1.82 m (6 ft 0 in)
- Position: Defender

Team information
- Current team: Feyenoord (U-19 manager)

Youth career
- VV Bavel

Senior career*
Years	Team	Apps	(Gls)
1988–1990	Willem II	33	(3)
1990–1995	Feyenoord	122	(2)
1995–1996	Galatasaray	25	(2)
1996–1997	Southampton	27	(1)
1997–2002	Feyenoord	100	(3)
Total		307	(11)

International career
1993–1994	Netherlands	8	(0)

Managerial career
- 2017–: Feyenoord (U-19)
- * Club domestic league appearances and goals

Ulrich van Gobbel (born 16 January 1971) is a Dutch Surinamese football coach and a former player who played as a defender for Feyenoord (where he had two spells), Galatasaray and Southampton. He works as a coach with the Under-19 squad of Feyenoord.

== Career ==
At Southampton, he scored two goals, with one coming against Lincoln City in the League Cup and one in the league against Leicester City.

A speedy defender - he, from block starts including reaction times, clocked almost 11.20 seconds over the 100 metres with automatic timing, and 6.7 s hand-timed over the 60m - van Gobbel made eight international appearances for the Netherlands national team.

== Personal life ==
Born in Surinam, van Gobbel grew up in Bavel, the Netherlands. In his biography, he explained to have had tough youth years with his father committing suicide after killing a woman in Rotterdam when Ulrich was only 15.

== Honours ==
Feyenoord

- KNVB Cup: 1990–91, 1991–92, 1993–94, 1994–95
- Dutch Supercup: 1991, 1999
- Eredivisie: 1992–93, 1998–99
- UEFA Cup: 2001–02

Galatasaray

- Turkish Cup: 1995–96
- Süper Lig: 1996–97
