= Ali Dia =

Senegalese footballer (born 1965)

Personal information
- Full name: Aly Dia
- Date of birth: 20 August 1965 (age 61)
- Place of birth: Dakar, Senegal
- Height: 1.78 m (5 ft 10 in)
- Position: Striker

Senior career*
Years	Team	Apps	(Gls)
1988–1989	Beauvais	1	(0)
1989–1990	Dijon	0	(0)
1990–1991	La Rochelle	1	(0)
1991–1992	Saint-Quentin	6	(0)
1993–1994	Châteaubriant	1	(1)
1995	FinnPa	5	(1)
1995	PK-35	3	(1)
1995	VfB Lübeck	2	(0)
1996	Blyth Spartans	1	(0)
1996	Southampton	1	(0)
1996–1997	Gateshead	8	(2)
1997–1998	Spennymoor United	2	
Total		30	(5)
- * Club domestic league appearances and goals

Aly Dia (born 20 August 1965), commonly known as Ali Dia, is a Senegalese former professional footballer who played as a striker.

In November 1996, Dia convinced Graeme Souness, the Southampton manager, that he was the cousin of FIFA World Player of the Year and Ballon d'Or winner George Weah, which led to him signing a one-month contract with Southampton days later. Dia played only one match in his short spell at the club. He came on as a substitute in a league game, but was then himself substituted, only playing for 53 minutes. He was subsequently released, 14 days into his contract.

== Career ==
After a playing career at the lower levels in France and Germany, and having already failed trials at Gillingham, Bournemouth and Rotherham United, playing once in a reserve game for the last, Dia joined non-league club Blyth Spartans, where he made only one substitute appearance – on 9 November 1996 in a Northern Premier League game against Boston United.

Days later, Dia was signed by Southampton manager Graeme Souness, after Souness received a phone call purporting to be from Liberian international and then-FIFA World Player of the Year George Weah. "Weah" told Souness that Dia was his cousin and had played for Paris Saint-Germain as well as 13 times for his country and should give him a chance at Southampton. None of this was true and the phone call to Souness was a hoax. Souness was convinced and, without any due diligence, Dia was signed on a one-month contract. However, it is disputed who made the initial call to Souness. Some sources state it was Dia's friend from university, while some say it was Dia's agent, and it has also been suggested that it was Dia himself who made the call. It was later reported that the same stunt had been pulled on Gillingham, who offered Dia a trial, but was let go by manager Tony Pulis who said that Dia was "rubbish". Harry Redknapp, then manager of West Ham United, also received the same call but dismissed it as "a wind-up".

Dia played just one game for Southampton, wearing the number 33 shirt, against Leeds United on 23 November 1996; he had originally been scheduled to play in a reserve team friendly against Arsenal, but the match was cancelled due to a waterlogged pitch. In the match against Leeds, he came on as a substitute for the injured Matt Le Tissier after 32 minutes, but was later substituted himself (for Ken Monkou) in the 85th minute; Leeds won the match 2–0. Le Tissier said: "He ran around the pitch like Bambi on ice; it was very embarrassing to watch."

Dia was released by Southampton two weeks into his contract. Following his release, he went on trial with Port Vale scoring twice in a reserve game against Sunderland. After no offer from Vale followed, he briefly played for Conference National side Gateshead, before leaving in February 1997. Dia played eight games for the North East outfit, including scoring on his debut in a 5–0 win over Bath City. A day after his Gateshead debut, his George Weah hoax was revealed in the national media. A 2015 article from Bleacher Report stated that Dia had also successfully pulled the same ruse on FinnPa and VfB Lübeck. He left both clubs following poor playing performances.

Speaking to the Gateshead Post after the story broke, Dia laughed off the allegations and stated he had recently scored for Senegal in a 3–1 1998 World Cup qualifying win over Guinea. However, this claim was not true as Senegal had already been knocked out in the first round of qualifiers. Dia said: "I have been portrayed as a con man and a poor player, but I am neither and intend to prove people wrong. Obviously I'm disappointed not to have made it in the Premiership, but I've got faith in my own ability and my only concern now is Gateshead. My contract is just until the end of the season. But if things go well, who knows, I could stay longer."

In the short spell between joining Saints and playing for Gateshead, he pocketed £3,500 in signing-on fees. Souness later admitted that Southampton paid Dia about £2,000 for his 14 days at the club, while Dia received a £1,500 signing-on fee at Gateshead. Dia was eventually transfer listed by Gateshead after a spell of poor form. After leaving Gateshead, he had a brief spell at Spennymoor United.

== Personal life ==
Dia studied business at Northumbria University in Newcastle, graduating in 2001. He received a Master of Business Administration from San Francisco State University in 2003. After finishing his education, Dia worked in the business sector in Qatar. In 2016, Bleacher Report tracked down Dia and it was revealed that he was living in London, but was looking to move back to Qatar. He told them that the Southampton story was "hurtful" to him and his family, but insisted that he was not a liar and that he trained with Southampton for a month and a half, where he impressed before making his debut, despite previous reports that he spent less than a week with Southampton before he made his infamous debut.

His son, Simon Dia, is a French football player, born and raised in France.

== Legacy ==
Dia has regularly featured in lists of bad players or bad transfers. He was named at Number 1 in a list of "The 50 worst footballers" in The Times and on ESPN's ranking of the 50 worst transfers in Premier League history.

== See also ==
- Alessandro Zarrelli – Italian footballer (1984–2018)
- Carlos Kaiser (footballer) – Brazilian con artist (born 1963)
- Grégoire Akcelrod – French footballer (born 1982)
- Živko Lukić – Serbian footballer (1943–2015)
- List of uncompetitive athletes
