= Alan Neilson =

Welsh footballer (born 1972)

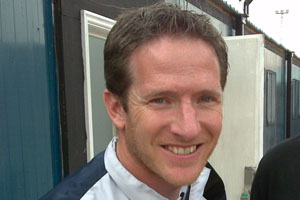

Personal information
- Date of birth: 26 September 1972 (age 54)
- Place of birth: Wegberg, West Germany
- Position: Defender

Youth career
- 1989–1991: Newcastle United

Senior career*
Years	Team	Apps	(Gls)
1991–1995	Newcastle United	42	(1)
1995–1997	Southampton	55	(0)
1997–2001	Fulham	29	(2)
2001–2002	Grimsby Town	10	(0)
2002–2005	Luton Town	57	(1)
2006–2007	Tamworth	20	(1)
2007	Salisbury City	5	(0)
Total		218	(5)

International career
1992–1996	Wales	5	(0)

Managerial career
- 2009: Luton Town (caretaker)
- 2012: Luton Town (caretaker)
- 2013: Luton Town (caretaker)
- * Club domestic league appearances and goals

Alan Neilson (born 26 September 1972) is a Welsh former professional footballer who works as a Professional Development Coach for Norwich City.

He played his entire career in England as a defender from 1991 until 2007, notably in the Premier League for Newcastle United and Southampton. He also played for Fulham, Grimsby Town, Luton Town, Tamworth and Salisbury City. He later re-joined Luton Town in 2008 as a youth coach, before becoming assistant manager and having three spells as the club's caretaker manager. He left the club in July 2013 and joined Cambridge United as assistant coach later that year. On 11 May 2015, he left the club as assistant manager, in the place of Joe Dunne.

== Playing career ==
=== Newcastle United ===
Neilson was born in Wegberg, West Germany, where his father was serving in the Royal Air Force. He qualified to play for Wales through ancestry. He started his professional football career with Newcastle United in 1989 as a trainee, making his first-team debut on 9 March 1991. Described as a "tidy" central-defender, he did the defensive tasks in a plain and simple manner, avoiding the spectacular, but suffered because of his slight frame and was never dominant in the box. He scored his only goal for Newcastle in a 2–1 defeat by Millwall at The Old Den on 21 September 1991.

Whilst with Newcastle he made four appearances for Wales, with his international debut coming as a late substitute for Dean Saunders against Republic of Ireland on 19 February 1992, with three further matches coming in 1994.

=== Southampton ===
After a total of 50 appearances for Newcastle he was transferred to Southampton for £500,000 in June 1995. His signing was Alan Ball's last act as manager before moving to Manchester City.

Neilson was a competent defender who could play at full-back or in the centre, but his career at The Dell was disrupted by frequent managerial changes. He made his debut on 26 August 1995 as a substitute at Everton, following which he replaced Jason Dodd at right-back for four matches before Dodd was recalled. Although Neilson made a few starts, his next run in the starting eleven came in March, when he took the place of Richard Hall at centre-half. In the 1996–97 season, with Graeme Souness as manager, Neilson made a total of 29 appearances as "The Saints" struggled near the foot of the table, missing relegation by one point, having been in last place with five matches to play.

Despite Saints' poor form, Neilson earned one further international cap while he was with the club, in a 7–1 defeat by Netherlands on 9 November 1996.

Souness left the club in the summer of 1997, being replaced by Dave Jones who brought in several new players, including left-back Lee Todd from his previous club, Stockport County. With Todd and Dodd as the two full-backs, Neilson's few appearances came in midfield, before moving to Fulham for £225,000 in November 1997, where he joined up with his former manager at Newcastle, Kevin Keegan.

=== Later career ===
Neilson suffered from injury problems throughout his career at Fulham, making just 29 league appearances in nearly five seasons. He made three league appearances during Fulham's 2000–01 season at the end of which they were promoted to the Premier League. One of these was a key game at closest rivals Blackburn Rovers in April 2001. Fulham were 1-0 down and were then reduced to ten men after the sending off of Rufus Brevett. Neilson was brought on for Barry Hayles to shore up the defence and they recovered to win 2-1. In October 2001, Neilson moved to Grimsby Town on a free transfer, but played just 12 games before being released in February 2002.

Later that month following his release from Grimsby, Neilson joined Luton Town, where he went on to make 57 appearances, scoring once against Stockport County.

Neilson joined Conference Premier club Tamworth in 2006, linking up with former Southampton teammate Richard Dryden, before a short spell with Salisbury City in 2007.

== Coaching career ==
Neilson left Tamworth in early 2007 to continue his coaching career at both Luton Town and at Barnfield College. He was undecided as to whether to retire from playing or not, but on 23 February 2007, he signed for Salisbury City on a short-term contract.

In June 2008, Neilson joined his former club Luton Town as youth development coach and was later given the position of first-team coach alongside Kevin Watson. On 1 October 2009, manager Mick Harford parted company with the Hatters, leaving Neilson in charge ahead of the game against his former team Tamworth just two days later. Neilson subsequently led the team on a five-game unbeaten run as caretaker, until Richard Money was installed as permanent manager on 30 October. Neilson was named as Money's assistant manager. Following the end of the 2009–10 season, Neilson's role was changed to first team development manager, with Gary Brabin taking over the position of assistant manager. Brabin took over from Money towards the end of the 2010–11 season and retained Neilson as a coach. Brabin was dismissed by the club in March 2012, with Neilson taking over for the next game, a 3–1 defeat to Braintree Town. Paul Buckle took over as Luton's manager shortly after this loss and again kept Neilson at the club as a coach. Buckle left the club 10 months later, with Neilson placed in temporary charge of the team. A draw and two defeats led Neilson to apologise to Luton supporters for the team's poor performances. John Still left his long-standing managerial position at League Two club Dagenham & Redbridge to become the new Luton manager on 26 February, and Neilson once more moved back into his coaching role under the club's fifth different manager. Neilson was released from his contract and left the club in July 2013 after five years in various coaching roles.

In October 2013, he applied jointly alongside John Psaras for the vacant managerial role at Forest Green Rovers. The application was unsuccessful, but Neilson later joined Cambridge United in December 2013 as assistant coach to former Luton manager Richard Money.

Neilson left Cambridge United on 11 May 2015. He joined the coaching team of the Norwich City Academy in August 2015.

== Managerial stats ==
Competitive matches only. Correct as of 1 March 2013.

Team	Nat	From	To	Record						
Team	Nat	From	To	P	W	D	L	GF	GA	Win %
Luton Town (caretaker)	(England)	1 October 2009	30 October 2009	5	4	1	0	9	3	80.00
Luton Town (caretaker)	(England)	31 March 2012	8 April 2012	1	0	0	1	1	3	0.00
Luton Town (caretaker)	(England)	19 February 2013	26 February 2013	3	0	1	2	3	6	0.00
Total				9	4	2	3	13	12	44.44
