= Alessandro Zarrelli =

Italian footballer (1984–2018)

Personal information
- Date of birth: 5 September 1984
- Place of birth: Rivoli, Italy
- Date of death: 21 November 2018 (aged 34)
- Place of death: Cambridge, England
- Position: Defensive midfielder

Youth career
- 2002–2004: A.C.D. Asti

Senior career*
Years	Team	Apps	(Gls)
2004–2005	Lisburn Distillery	0	(0)
2005	Bangor City	0	(0)
2005	Connah's Quay Nomads	0	(0)
2006–2008	Ardeer Thistle	31	(5)
2008–2009	Queens Park	0	(0)
2009–2010	→ Irvine Meadow (loan)	9	(0)
2010–2011	Northwich Victoria	16	(0)
2011	Hucknall Town	8	(0)
2012	Lincoln Moorlands Railway	19	(0)
2012–2013	Diss Town	7	(0)
2013	→ Downham Town (loan)	14	(0)
2013	Long Melford	9	(0)
2014	Erith & Belvedere	17	(0)
2014	Eastbourne Town	6	(0)
2014	Sheppey United	3	(0)
2014–2015	Selkirk	26	(0)
2015	→ Widnes (loan)	7	(0)
2015–2016	St Cuthbert Wanderers	21	(0)
2016	Boston Town	0	(0)
2016	Grimsby Borough	7	(0)
2016	Teversal	2	(0)
2016	→ Heather St John's (loan)	3	(0)
2016	Corsham Town	16	(2)
2017	→ Almondsbury UWE (loan)	1	(1)
2017–2018	Port Talbot Town	23	(0)
2018	Sholing	1	(0)
Total		261	(9)
- * Club domestic league appearances and goals

Alessandro "Alex" Zarrelli^{1} (5 September 1984 – 21 November 2018) was an Italian amateur footballer who featured on a 2006 Sky TV documentary called Super Fakes in the United Kingdom where he had attempted to dupe several professional football teams into signing him as a player by sending faxes claiming to be a member of the Italian Football Federation. A midfielder, he later played semi-professionally for a number of British non-League clubs, most notably Northwich Victoria and Queen's Park. He died on 21 November 2018 after a car crash on the A505 road in Cambridgeshire.

== Super Fakes documentary ==
In 2006, he was featured on a Sky TV documentary Super Fakes which covered the stories of Zarrelli and Ali Dia who had both attempted to con professional football clubs into signing them. The show focussed on Zarrelli's activity during the 2004–05 season and featured interviews from the coaches and owners who came into contact with him during this period. Zarrelli, at the time, was a young Italian amateur footballer who began sending fraudulent faxes to clubs in Northern Ireland and Wales posing as an Italian football executive who was offering clubs the chance to sign an up-and-coming young professional footballer on a cultural exchange loan from the Italian Football Federation. The letter was signed by an Italian executive named Matteo Colobase; in reality Colobase did not exist and was Zarrelli himself. The faxes stated that the footballer on offer had supposedly played at youth level for clubs such as Sheffield Wednesday and Rangers. In reality Zarrelli was an amateur player who had once played youth team football for A.C.D. Asti but ultimately had never played professionally nor had he been attached to any of the clubs the letter claimed he had been a part of. He also claimed his brother had previously played for Torino which was also untrue. The first club he contacted was in January 2005, when he approached IFA Premiership side Lisburn Distillery, who eventually were duped into signing him on a short-term deal, but he was released after an underwhelming performance in a friendly against Finn Harps. He then contacted Welsh Premier League side Bangor City in July 2005, who were unaware of his previous exploits in Northern Ireland, but after staying with the club ten days, manager Peter Davenport contacted Mike Rigg who worked for Zarrelli's supposed former club Sheffield Wednesday. Rigg said that they had never heard of him, equally Glasgow Rangers also confirmed that they had no knowledge of the player ever being on their books and Antonelli Valenti of the Italian Football Federation said Zarrelli's name appeared nowhere on the association's database at any level. Suspicions started to arise during his time at Bangor, when he requested a wage of £200 a week despite initially stating in one of his letters that his wages would be supplied by the FIGC.

Davenport said "He was only here for about a week to ten days. In that time, I checked a bit into his background and it didn't add up. He arrived here with a broken nose, so he never actually played for Bangor. He just took part in one warm-up session. He wasn't anything special." Whilst staying with the club, he stayed in the town's Regency Hotel, owned by one of the club's directors, in which upon his departure, he failed to settle his bill. He also spent a brief spell with Connah's Quay Nomads where he was once again found out. Nomads secretary Bobby Hunter said of Zarrelli "He was your stereotypical smooth Italian. He certainly looked the part, but he couldn't play to save his life. Our manager Neville Powell wasn't interested in him. I wondered why the Italian FA would want to send the cream of their youth to Connah's Quay.". He later tried his luck in approaching Welsh Premier League champions Total Network Solutions FC just after they had met Liverpool in the preliminary stages of the UEFA Champions League. "We didn't pursue it, we did our homework beforehand" said TNS secretary, Ian Williams.

He was eventually exposed by the show when the documentary crew was able to track the fax number Zarrelli had been using to a shop in Asti, Italy round the corner from his parents' house. The crew set up a sting operation in London, where they staged a meeting posing as football scouts interested in signing him. Zarrelli showed up and began to talk for several minutes explaining that he had once played for Rangers and Wednesday and had been recently playing for Milton Keynes Dons. Asked initially about the "Matteo Colobase", Zarrelli said that he was a friend of the family before the interviewer revealed who he actually was and that the meeting was a setup. Zarrelli admitted his deception to the crew and later phoned the TV's presenters to sarcastically thank them for making him famous. This recording was played out at the end of the show.

== Football career ==
Since the controversy in 2005 and having it reported in the documentary in 2006, Zarrelli managed to progress to a career in semi-professional football and soon moved to Scotland where he played with Ardeer Thistle and Queens Park, before being loaned out to Irvine Meadow. He then moved back to England in 2010, to play with Northwich Victoria Hucknall Town and Lincoln Moorlands Railway. In September 2012, he signed as a semi-professional footballer for Diss Town and days after his signature, club chairman Dicky Upson said that "he will be judged on his footballing ability", adding, "We are aware of what happened in the past, which was several years ago. The programme is still on YouTube and I have seen it. I have met and spoken with Alex, and told him he will be judged on his footballing ability and nothing else at our club". In February 2013, he signed on loan for Downham Town.

Downham boss Pete Brassett said about his new signing, "When I first met Alex, he was very honest. He told me all about what has happened in the past. We will move forward and it doesn't really affect me or the club. The past is the past – without a doubt he's got his life back on track. Some people would have buried their head in the sand but he's come through it, picked himself back up again, and I respect him for that." In August 2013, Zarrelli joined Long Melford. He later moved on to Erith & Belvedere in January 2014 until the end of the season and would eventually suffer relegation from the Isthman League. Zarrelli joined Eastbourne Town in June 2014, where he signed a short-term deal until September. When the deal expired he moved to Sheppey United. He went on to sign for Selkirk FC in the Scottish Lowland League

In July 2015 he joined St Cuthbert Wanderers where he helped the Scottish club winning a South of Scotland Football League Treble in the 2015–16 season. At the end of that season he joined Boston Town for one game only in order to help them pin the Lincolnshire Senior Cup Final that the Lincolnshire club eventually lost 2–1.

He joined Grimsby Borough in August 2016, but after an unconvincing spell by November he was sent on loan to Heather St John's. In January 2017, Zarrelli then got a move to Corsham Town playing for manager and friend Nigel Tripp; however, after turmoil within the club and the sacking of the manager, most of the players left in protest and he was sent on loan to UWE where he scored in the only game played for the club. After an EGM at Corsham Town a new club board extraordinarily reinstalled Tripp as manager and Zarrelli was recalled from his loan to finish the season at the club helping them to avoid relegation and scoring two goals in due course. Zarrelli left Corsham Town by mutual consent a few days after Tripp's resignation at the end of the season.

Zarrelli returned to Wales twelve years after the Super Fakes Welsh controversy in an unexpected move and joined Welsh side Port Talbot Town in July 2017. Zarrelli joined Sholing shortly before his death, making one appearance in each of league and cup.

== Death ==
On 21 November 2018, Zarrelli was killed when his blue Mini Cooper collided head on with a Volkswagen Caddy van on the A505 between Royston and Duxford. Although initially surviving the crash he died from his injuries later on in Addenbrooke's Hospital in Cambridge.

== Notes ==
1. Zarrelli is often incorrectly named in most sources as "Alessandro Zarelli".
