= Kiko Charana =

Portuguese footballer

Personal information
- Full name: Manuel Henrique Baptista Gomes Charana
- Date of birth: 24 October 1976 (age 50)
- Place of birth: Cedofeita, Portugal
- Height: 1.74 m (5 ft 8 1/2 in)
- Position: Forward

Youth career
- 1987–1988: Leixões
- 1988: Tenente Valdez
- 1989: Leixões
- 1990–1991: Boavista
- 1991–1992: Leixões
- 1992–1995: Sporting CP

Senior career*
Years	Team	Apps	(Gls)
1995–1996	O Elvas		
1996	Belenenses	0	(0)
1996–1997	Stockport County	3	(0)
1998	Campomaiorense	2	(0)
1998–1999	Estoril	4	(0)
1999–2000	Campomaiorense	0	(0)
2000–2001	Oriental	4	(0)
Total		13	(0)
- * Club domestic league appearances and goals

Manuel Henrique Baptista Gomes Charana (born 24 October 1976 in Cedofeita, Porto District), commonly known as Kiko, is a Portuguese retired professional footballer who played as a forward.

After arriving in England in December 1996, Kiko played thrice in the Football League Second Division for Stockport County. Kiko played two times for Campomaiorense during the 1997–98 Portuguese Primeira Divisão.
