= 1996–97 Football League Cup =

League Cup, Coca-Cola Cup

Tournament details
- Country: England; Wales
- Teams: 92

Final positions
- Champions: Leicester City (2nd title)
- Runners-up: Middlesbrough

Tournament statistics
- Top goal scorer(s): Fabrizio Ravanelli (9 goals)

The 1996–97 Football League Cup (known as the Coca-Cola Cup for sponsorship reasons) was the 37th Football League Cup, a knockout competition for England's top 92 football clubs.

The tournament was won by Leicester City, who beat Middlesbrough 1–0 in the final replay at Hillsborough after finishing 1–1 at Wembley Stadium.

== First round ==
66 of the First, Second and Third Division clubs competed from the first round. Each section was divided equally into a pot of seeded clubs and a pot of unseeded clubs. Clubs' rankings depended upon their finishing position in the 1995–96 season.

=== First leg ===
Home team	Result	Away team	Date
Brentford	1–0	Plymouth Argyle	20 August 1996
Brighton & Hove Albion	0–1	Birmingham City	21 August 1996
Cardiff City	1–0	Northampton Town	20 August 1996
Carlisle United	1–0	Chester City	20 August 1996
Colchester United	2–3	West Bromwich Albion	20 August 1996
Darlington	1–0	Rotherham United	20 August 1996
Doncaster Rovers	1–1	York City	20 August 1996
Exeter City	0–4	Barnet	20 August 1996
Hartlepool United	2–2	Lincoln City	20 August 1996
Hereford United	3–0	Cambridge United	20 August 1996
Huddersfield Town	3–0	Wrexham	20 August 1996
Hull City	2–2	Scarborough	20 August 1996
Ipswich Town	2–1	Bournemouth	20 August 1996
Luton Town	3–0	Bristol Rovers	20 August 1996
Mansfield Town	0–3	Burnley	20 August 1996
Millwall	1–0	Peterborough United	21 August 1996
Notts County	1–1	Bury	20 August 1996
Oldham Athletic	0–1	Grimsby Town	20 August 1996
Oxford United	1–1	Norwich City	20 August 1996
Port Vale	1–0	Crewe Alexandra	20 August 1996
Portsmouth	2–0	Leyton Orient	20 August 1996
Reading	1–1	Wycombe Wanderers	20 August 1996
Rochdale	2–1	Barnsley	20 August 1996
Scunthorpe United	2–1	Blackpool	20 August 1996
Sheffield United	3–0	Bradford City	20 August 1996
Shrewsbury Town	0–2	Tranmere Rovers	21 August 1996
Southend United	0–2	Fulham	20 August 1996
Stockport County	2–1	Chesterfield	20 August 1996
Swansea City	0–1	Gillingham	20 August 1996
Swindon Town	2–0	Wolverhampton Wanderers	20 August 1996
Torquay United	3–3	Bristol City	20 August 1996
Walsall	1–0	Watford	20 August 1996
Wigan Athletic	2–3	Preston North End	20 August 1996

=== Second leg ===
Home team	Result	Away team	Date	Agg.
Barnet	2–0	Exeter City	3 September 1996	6–0
Barnsley	2–0	Rochdale	3 September 1996	3–2
Birmingham City	2–0	Brighton & Hove Albion	4 September 1996	3–0
Blackpool	2–0	Scunthorpe United	3 September 1996	3–2
Bournemouth	0–3	Ipswich Town	3 September 1996	1–5
Bradford City	1–2	Sheffield United	3 September 1996	1–5
Bristol City	1–0	Torquay United	3 September 1996	4–3
Bristol Rovers	2–1	Luton Town	4 September 1996	2–4
Burnley	2–0	Mansfield Town	3 September 1996	5–0
Bury	1–0	Notts County	3 September 1996	2–1
Cambridge United	1–1	Hereford United	3 September 1996	1–4
Chester City	1–3	Carlisle United	3 September 1996	1–4
Chesterfield	1–2	Stockport County	3 September 1996	2–4
Crewe Alexandra	1–5	Port Vale	3 September 1996	1–6
Fulham	1–2	Southend United	3 September 1996	3–2
Gillingham	2–0	Swansea City	3 September 1996	3–0
Grimsby Town	0–1	Oldham Athletic	3 September 1996	1–1
Leyton Orient	1–0	Portsmouth	4 September 1996	1–2
Lincoln City	3–2	Hartlepool United	3 September 1996	5–4
Northampton Town	2–0	Cardiff City	3 September 1996	2–1
Norwich City	2–3	Oxford United	4 September 1996	3–4
Peterborough United	2–0	Millwall	3 September 1996	2–1
Plymouth Argyle	0–0	Brentford	3 September 1996	0–1
Preston North End	4–4	Wigan Athletic	3 September 1996	7–6
Rotherham United	0–1	Darlington	3 September 1996	0–2
Scarborough	3–2	Hull City	3 September 1996	5–4
Tranmere Rovers	1–1	Shrewsbury Town	3 September 1996	3–1
Watford	2–0	Walsall	3 September 1996	2–1
West Bromwich Albion	1–3	Colchester United	3 September 1996	4–5
Wolverhampton Wanderers	1–0	Swindon Town	4 September 1996	1–2
Wrexham	1–2	Huddersfield Town	3 September 1996	1–5
Wycombe Wanderers	2–0	Reading	3 September 1996	3–1
York City	2–0	Doncaster Rovers	3 September 1996	3–1

== Second round ==
The 33 winners from the first round joined the 15 Premier League clubs not participating in European competition plus the 3 non-promoted play-off teams from the First Division and the 3 relegated clubs from the Premier League in the 1995–96 season in round two. First leg matches were played on the 17 and 18 September, second leg matches were played on 24 and 25 September.

=== First leg ===
Home team	Score	Away team	Date
Barnet	1–1	West Ham United	18 September 1996
Barnsley	1–1	Gillingham	17 September 1996
Blackpool	1–4	Chelsea	18 September 1996
Brentford	1–2	Blackburn Rovers	17 September 1996
Bristol City	0–0	Bolton Wanderers	18 September 1996
Bury	1–3	Crystal Palace	17 September 1996
Charlton Athletic	4–1	Burnley	17 September 1996
Coventry City	1–1	Birmingham City	18 September 1996
Everton	1–1	York City	18 September 1996
Fulham	1–1	Ipswich Town	17 September 1996
Huddersfield Town	1–1	Colchester United	17 September 1996
Leeds United	2–2	Darlington	18 September 1996
Lincoln City	4–1	Manchester City	17 September 1996
Luton Town	1–0	Derby County	17 September 1996
Middlesbrough	7–0	Hereford United	18 September 1996
Nottingham Forest	1–0	Wycombe Wanderers	18 September 1996
Oldham Athletic	2–2	Tranmere Rovers	17 September 1996
Port Vale	1–0	Carlisle United	17 September 1996
Preston North End	1–1	Tottenham Hotspur	17 September 1996
Scarborough	0–2	Leicester City	17 September 1996
Sheffield Wednesday	1–1	Oxford United	18 September 1996
Southampton	2–0	Peterborough United	18 September 1996
Stockport County	2–1	Sheffield United	17 September 1996
Stoke City	1–0	Northampton Town	18 September 1996
Swindon Town	1–2	Queens Park Rangers	18 September 1996
Watford	0–2	Sunderland	17 September 1996
Wimbledon	1–0	Portsmouth	18 September 1996

=== Second leg ===
Home team	Score	Away team	Date	Agg
Birmingham City	0–1	Coventry City	24 September 1996	1–2
Blackburn Rovers	2–0	Brentford	24 September 1996	4–1
Bolton Wanderers	3–1	Bristol City	24 September 1996	3–1
Burnley	1–2	Charlton Athletic	24 September 1996	2–6
Carlisle United	2–2	Port Vale	24 September 1996	2–3
Chelsea	1–3	Blackpool	25 September 1996	5–4
Colchester United	0–2	Huddersfield Town	24 September 1996	1–3
Crystal Palace	4–0	Bury	24 September 1996	7–1
Darlington	0–2	Leeds United	24 September 1996	2–4
Derby County	2–2	Luton Town	25 September 1996	2–3
Gillingham	1–0	Barnsley	24 September 1996	2–1
Hereford United	0–3	Middlesbrough	24 September 1996	0–10
Ipswich Town	4–2	Fulham	24 September 1996	5–3
Leicester City	2–1	Scarborough	25 September 1996	4–1
Manchester City	0–1	Lincoln City	24 September 1996	1–5
Northampton Town	1–2	Stoke City	24 September 1996	1–3
Oxford United	1–0	Sheffield Wednesday	24 September 1996	2–1
Peterborough United	1–4	Southampton	25 September 1996	1–6
Portsmouth	1–1	Wimbledon	25 September 1996	1–2
Queens Park Rangers	1–3	Swindon Town	25 September 1996	3–4
Sheffield United	2–5	Stockport County	24 September 1996	3–7
Sunderland	1–0	Watford	24 September 1996	3–0
Tottenham Hotspur	3–0	Preston North End	25 September 1996	4–1
Tranmere Rovers	0–1	Oldham Athletic	24 September 1996	2–3
West Ham United	1–0	Barnet	25 September 1996	2–1
Wycombe Wanderers	1–1	Nottingham Forest	24 September 1996	1–2
York City	3–2	Everton	24 September 1996	4–3

== Third round ==
The 27 winners from the second round joined the five Premiership clubs participating in European competition in round three. Matches were played on 22 and 23 October.

=== Ties ===
Home team	Score	Away team	Date
Blackburn Rovers	0–1	Stockport County	22 October 1996
Bolton Wanderers	2–1	Chelsea	22 October 1996
Gillingham	2–2	Coventry City	22 October 1996
Ipswich Town	4–1	Crystal Palace	22 October 1996
Wimbledon	1–1	Luton Town	22 October 1996
Port Vale	0–0	Oxford United	22 October 1996
York City	0–2	Leicester City	22 October 1996
Charlton Athletic	1–1	Liverpool	23 October 1996
Leeds United	1–2	Aston Villa	23 October 1996
Manchester United	2–1	Swindon Town	23 October 1996
Middlesbrough	5–1	Huddersfield Town	23 October 1996
Newcastle United	1–0	Oldham Athletic	23 October 1996
Southampton	1–1	Lincoln City	23 October 1996
Stoke City	1–1	Arsenal	23 October 1996
Tottenham Hotspur	2–1	Sunderland	23 October 1996
West Ham United	4–1	Nottingham Forest	23 October 1996

=== Replays ===
Home team	Score	Away team	Date
Coventry City	0–1	Gillingham	13 November 1996
Luton Town	1–2	Wimbledon	12 November 1996
Oxford United	2–0	Port Vale	5 November 1996
Liverpool	4–1	Charlton Athletic	13 November 1996
Lincoln City	1–3	Southampton	12 November 1996
Arsenal	5–2	Stoke City	13 November 1996

== Fourth round ==
Most matches were played on 26 November 27 November with two replays being played on 18 December.

26 November 1996

Ipswich Town	1–0	Gillingham
Naylor 73'

Portman Road, Ipswich
Attendance: 13,537
26 November 1996

Oxford United	1–1	Southampton
Moody 90'		Dryden 26'

Manor Ground, Oxford
Attendance: 9,473
26 November 1996

Wimbledon	1–0	Aston Villa
Gayle 44'

Selhurst Park, London
Attendance: 7,573
27 November 1996

Bolton Wanderers	6–1	Tottenham Hotspur
McGinlay 9' 37' 74' (pen.); Taggart 60'; Blake 79'; Taylor 86'		Sheringham 19'

Burnden Park, Bolton
Attendance: 18,621
27 November 1996

Leicester City	2–0	Manchester United
Claridge 38'; Heskey 77'

Filbert Street, Leicester
Attendance: 20,428
27 November 1996

Liverpool	4–2	Arsenal
McManaman 26'; Fowler 39' (pen.) 52'; Berger 72'		Wright 13' (pen.) 68' (pen.)

Anfield, Liverpool
Attendance: 32,814
27 November 1996

Middlesbrough	3–1	Newcastle United
Whyte 27'; Beck 61'; Ravanelli 89'		Shearer 45'

Riverside Stadium, Middlesbrough
Attendance: 29,831
27 November 1996

West Ham United	1–1	Stockport County
Răducioiu 12'		Cavaco 51'

Boleyn Ground, London
Attendance: 29,831

=== Replays ===
18 December 1996

Southampton	3–2	Oxford United
Berkovic 21'; Dryden 52'; Østenstad 58'		Jemson 42'; Ford 59'

The Dell, Southampton
Attendance: 10,737
18 December 1996

Stockport County	2–1	West Ham United
Dowie 23' (o.g.); Angell 27'		Dicks 22'

Edgeley Park, Stockport
Attendance: 9,834

== Quarter-finals ==
The four matches were played between 8 and 29 January.

8 January 1997

Bolton Wanderers	0–2	Wimbledon
		Ekoku 3'; Leonhardsen 22'

Burnden Park, Bolton
Attendance: 16,968
8 January 1997

Middlesbrough	2–1	Liverpool
Hignett 14'; Vickers 27'		McManaman 65'

Riverside Stadium, Middlesbrough
Attendance: 28,670
21 January 1997

Ipswich Town	0–1	Leicester City
		Robins 42'

Portman Road, Ipswich
Attendance: 19,000
22 January 1997

Stockport County	2–2	Southampton
Armstrong 25'; Cavaco 26'		Østenstad 16' 85'

Edgeley Park, Stockport
Attendance: 9,840

=== Replay ===
29 January 1997

Southampton	1–2	Stockport County
Le Tissier 9'		Angell 63'; Mutch 83'

The Dell, Southampton
Attendance: 13,428

== Semi-finals ==
The semi-final draw was made in January 1997 after the conclusion of the quarter finals. Unlike the other rounds, the semi-final ties were played over two legs, with each team playing one leg at home. The first leg matches were played on 18 and 26 February 1997, the second leg matches were played on 11 and 12 March 1997. Leicester City went through on away goals to reach their first cup final in 28 years at the expense of Wimbledon, while Division Two underdogs Stockport gave Middlesbrough a run for their money, going out by a single goal.

=== First leg ===
18 February 1997
19:45

Leicester City	0–0	Wimbledon

Filbert Street, Leicester
Attendance: 16,021
26 February 1997
19:45

Stockport County	0–2	Middlesbrough
		Beck 73'; Ravanelli 79'

Edgeley Park, Stockport
Attendance: 11,778

=== Second leg ===
11 March 1997
19:45

Wimbledon	1–1	Leicester City
Gayle 23'		Grayson 53'

Selhurst Park, London
Attendance: 17,810

Leicester City win on away goals

12 March 1997
19:45

Middlesbrough	0–1	Stockport County
		Connelly 6'

Riverside Stadium, Middlesbrough
Attendance: 29,633

Middlesbrough win 2–1 on aggregate

== Final ==
The 1997 Coca-Cola Cup Final was played on 6 April 1997 and was contested between Leicester City and Middlesbrough at Wembley Stadium. Leicester won 1–0 in the replay at Hillsborough on 16 April 1997. This was the last year that the Football League Cup Final was decided by a replay.

6 April 1997
15:00

Leicester City	1–1 (a.e.t.)	Middlesbrough
Heskey 118'	Report	Ravanelli 95'

Wembley Stadium, London
Attendance: 76,757
Referee: Martin Bodenham

=== Replay ===
16 April 1997
19:45

Leicester City	1–0 (a.e.t.)	Middlesbrough
Claridge 100'	Report

Hillsborough, Sheffield
Attendance: 39,428
Referee: Martin Bodenham
