= Russell Watkinson =

English footballer

Personal information
- Date of birth: 3 December 1977 (age 48)
- Place of birth: Epsom, England
- Position: Winger

Senior career*
Years	Team	Apps	(Gls)
1994–1996	Woking		
1996–1998	Southampton	2	(0)
1998	→ Millwall (loan)		
1998–1999	Aldershot Town	17	(0)
- Farnborough Town
- * Club domestic league appearances and goals

Russell Watkinson (born 3 December 1977) is an English former footballer who played as a midfielder. Whilst at Southampton, Watkinson made two substitute appearances in the Premier League in games against Tottenham Hotspur and Middlesbrough.
