= Grégoire Akcelrod =

French footballer (born 1982)

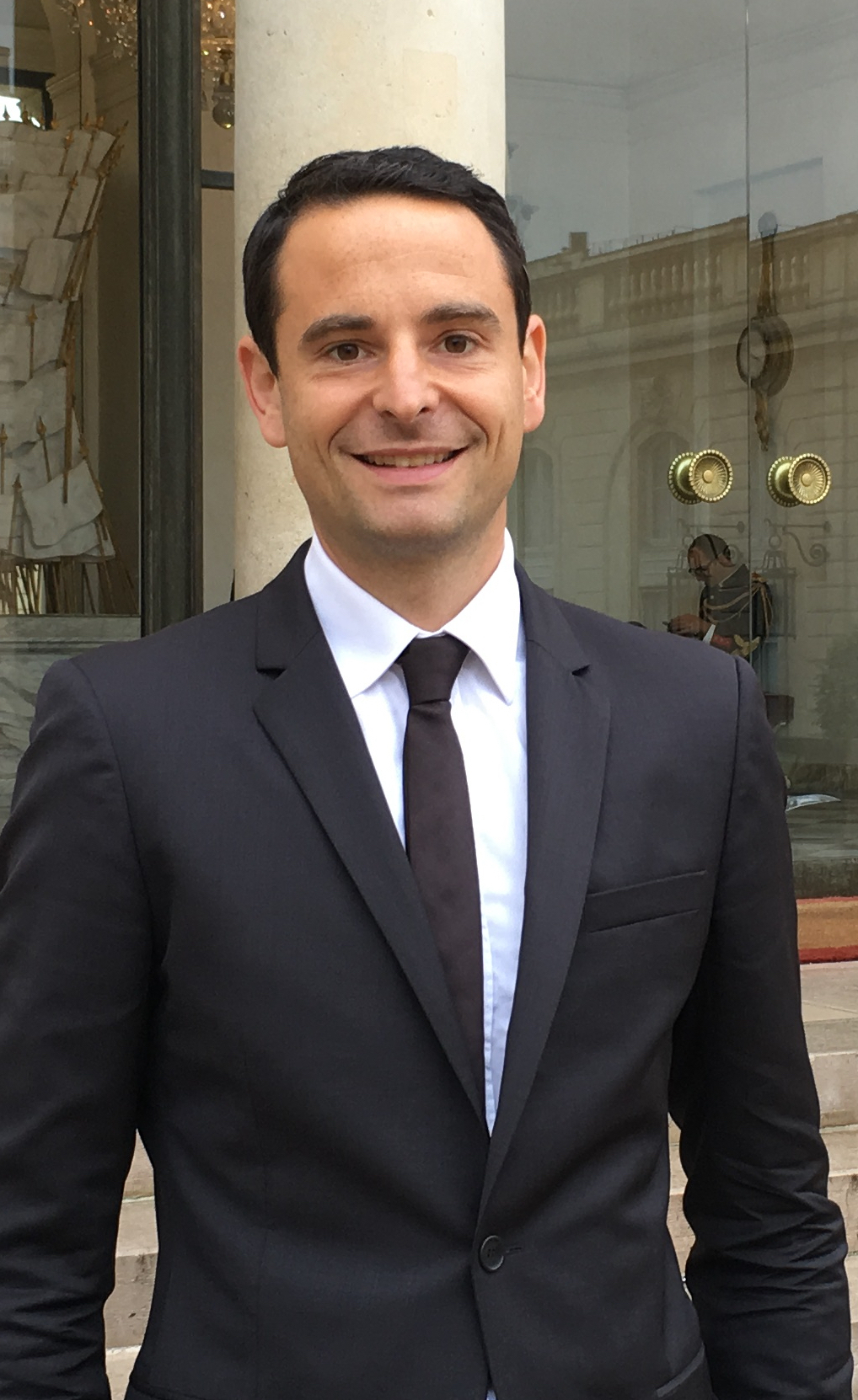
- Akcelrod in 2020

Personal information
- Full name: Gregoire Sebastien Akcelrod
- Date of birth: 17 September 1982 (age 44)
- Place of birth: Saint-Germain-en-Laye, France
- Positions: Midfielder; forward

Youth career
- Sens
- Racing Club

Senior career*
Years	Team	Apps	(Gls)
2001–2003	Racing Club B		
2004–2005	RUS Givry		
2005	Cwmbrân Town	0	(0)
2011	Mississauga Eagles		
2021–2022	Atlètic Amèrica	13	(4)
- * Club domestic league appearances and goals

Grégoire Sébastien Akcelrod (born 17 September 1982) is a French football agent and former player. He is the founder and executive director of One Soccer Agency.

Besides in France, Akcelrod played in Belgium, Wales, Canada and Andorra.

Following his retirement, Akcelrod became an author and football agent. He is among the most influential agents in women's football, with clients including Kelly Gago, Roselène Khezami, Sabah Seghir and Ena Taslidža.

== Early life ==
Akcelrod grew up in Paris, France. He played his first football game at the age of ten. He grew up idolizing footballers George Weah and Zinedine Zidane and supported Paris Saint-Germain.

== Playing career ==
As a youth player, Akcelrod joined the youth academy of FC Sens.

In 2009, he almost signed for Bulgarian side CSKA Sofia. However, the transfer fell through after a supporter of French side Paris Saint-Germain, who he claimed to have played for, found that he never actually signed for the clubs he claimed to have signed for during his career. Akcelrod's fabricated CV and website had also lead him to trials with Swindon Town, Norwich City and AFC Bournemouth in England.

After that, he trialed for many clubs worldwide. He eventually signed for Canadian side Mississauga Eagles in 2011. In 2021, he signed for Atlètic Amèrica in Andorra.

== Post-playing career ==
After playing for Mississauga Eagles, Akcelrod became a football agent in Andorra. In 2022, he published a book entitled L'amour ou la mort (transl. Love or death) about his grandmother Nita Raya's relationship with French actor Maurice Chevalier.

== Personal life ==
Akcelrod is the son of Patrick Akcelrod. He is also the grandson of Romanian Jewish actress Nita Raya, who was once the wife of French actor Maurice Chevalier.
