= Richard Dryden =

English footballer and manager

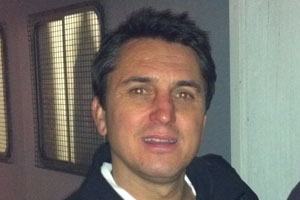

Personal information
- Full name: Richard Andrew Dryden
- Date of birth: 14 June 1969 (age 57)
- Place of birth: Stroud, England
- Height: 6 ft 0 in (1.83 m)
- Position: Defender

Youth career
- –1987: Bristol Rovers

Senior career*
| Years | Team | Apps | (Gls) |
| 1987–1989 | Bristol Rovers | 13 | (0) |
| 1988–1989 | → Exeter City (loan) | 6 | (0) |
| 1989–1991 | Exeter City | 86 | (13) |
| 1991 | → Manchester City (loan) | 0 | (0) |
| 1991–1993 | Notts County | 31 | (1) |
| 1992 | → Plymouth Argyle (loan) | 5 | (0) |
| 1993–1994 | Birmingham City | 48 | (0) |
| 1994–1996 | Bristol City | 37 | (2) |
| 1996–2001 | Southampton | 47 | (1) |
| 1999 | → Stoke City (loan) | 3 | (0) |
| 2000 | → Stoke City (loan) | 10 | (0) |
| 2000 | → Northampton Town (loan) | 10 | (0) |
| 2000–2001 | → Swindon Town (loan) | 7 | (0) |
| 2001–2002 | Luton Town | 23 | (0) |
| 2001–2002 | → Scarborough (loan) | 4 | (1) |
| 2002–2003 | Scarborough | 22 | (1) |
| 2003 | Worksop Town | | |
| 2003–2007 | Tamworth | 23 | (2) |
| 2007 | Shepshed Dynamo | | |
| Total | | 376 | (21) |

Managerial career
- 2007–2010: Worcester City
- 2015–2016: Notts County (caretaker)
- 2025: Yeovil Town (caretaker)
- 2025: Yeovil Town
- * Club domestic league appearances and goals

Richard Andrew Dryden (born 14 June 1969) is an English former professional footballer turned manager and coach, who was most recently first-team manager at National League side Yeovil Town.

== Playing career ==
Born in Stroud, Gloucestershire, Dryden started his career as a trainee with Bristol Rovers, joining them as a professional on 14 July 1987. He then joined Exeter City on loan on 22 September 1988 before signing permanently on 8 March 1989 for a fee of £10,000, where he first played under manager Terry Cooper. During Dryden's time at Exeter, he made a total of 92 appearances and also spent time on loan with Manchester City. While at Exeter, he played a major part in their 1989–90 Fourth Division title triumph. Notts County was the next stop for Dryden, joining on 9 August 1991 for a fee of £250,000. He moved on to Birmingham City for £165,000 on 19 March 1993, where he was re-united with Terry Cooper. After Birmingham, Dryden moved on 16 December 1994 to Bristol City for a fee of £140,000, the rivals of his first club, Bristol Rovers.

On the recommendation of Terry Cooper, now Southampton's chief scout, Dryden moved to Southampton on 6 August 1996 for £150,000. He made his debut on 18 August 1996 at home to Chelsea and successfully marked Gianluca Vialli out of the game in a 0–0 draw. Although he featured regularly in the first team under manager Graeme Souness in 1996–97 (making 29 league appearances), the remainder of his time at The Dell was difficult as Southampton had 5 managers during the course of his 5 seasons with the club. He played a total of 54 games for the FA Premier League side, scoring 4 goals in all competitions. Three of these goals came in Southampton's run in the 1996–97 League Cup. This included a goal against Peterborough United and two against Oxford United; one in the original tie and another in the replay. His only other goal for Southampton came against Nottingham Forest in the league.

He was also loaned out to Stoke City, Northampton Town and Swindon Town while at Southampton. Whilst at Stoke he played as a substitute as they won the 2000 Football League Trophy Final. He signed on loan for Swindon on 24 November 2000. Dryden's spell at the club hardly started well – he was credited with an own goal on his debut, during a 3–0 loss at home against Stoke City on 25 November. This was followed by two consecutive victories against Northampton Town and Rotherham United, but his final four appearances for Swindon all ended in defeat.

On 2 February 2001, Dryden joined Luton Town on a permanent contract. He moved on to Scarborough on 11 July 2002 after playing for the club on loan in the 2001–02 season.

May 2003 saw him join Worksop Town for a brief spell before moving to Tamworth.

== Managerial and coaching career ==
Dryden was appointed assistant manager of Tamworth when Mark Cooper took charge of the club in April 2004. On 24 January 2007, Dryden's contract with Tamworth was terminated by mutual consent, at the same time as Cooper's contract.

In March 2007, Dryden signed for Shepshed Dynamo. In November 2007, he became manager of Conference North club Worcester City but left this post after being sacked on 17 January 2010. He was subsequently appointed assistant manager at Darlington, but was dismissed together with Mark Cooper on 14 October 2011.

Dryden was appointed as York City's head of youth team coaching in July 2012, working alongside youth team coach Steve Torpey. He left in December 2014 after a reorganisation of the club's youth coaching structure.

In October 2015, he was officially confirmed as the new under 21s manager at Notts County. Following the departure of Ricardo Moniz as manager in December 2015, he was appointed caretaker manager of the first team. Following Mark Cooper's appointment as Notts County manager in March 2016, he became a part of Cooper's backroom team in the first team set-up once again.

In June 2016, he joined Indian club East Bengal as assistant coach. In May 2021, Dryden followed Mark Cooper again to be his assistant at Barrow. On 20 March 2022, Dryden left the club following the mutual termination of Cooper's contract.

Ahead of the 2025–26 season, after spending two seasons as assistant manager at Aldershot Town, Dryden was reunited with Mark Cooper once again after being appointed as first-team coach at Yeovil Town. On 26 August 2025, Dryden was appointed caretaker manager following the departure of Mark Cooper. On 22 September 2025, after the resignation of Danny Webb, Dryden was re-appointed as first-team manager until the end of the 2025–26 season. On 25 November 2025, Dryden was replaced as manager by Billy Rowley.

== Career statistics ==
Appearances and goals by club, season and competition
| Club | Season | League | | | FA Cup | | League Cup | | Other | | Total | |
| Club | Season | Division | Apps | Goals | Apps | Goals | Apps | Goals | Apps | Goals | Apps | Goals |
|---|---|---|---|---|---|---|---|---|---|---|---|---|
| Bristol Rovers | 1986–87 | Third Division | 6 | 0 | 0 | 0 | 0 | 0 | 1 | 0 | 7 | 0 |
| Bristol Rovers | 1987–88 | Third Division | 6 | 0 | 2 | 0 | 2 | 0 | 1 | 0 | 11 | 0 |
| Bristol Rovers | 1988–89 | Third Division | 1 | 0 | 0 | 0 | 1 | 0 | 0 | 0 | 2 | 0 |
| Bristol Rovers | Total | | 13 | 0 | 2 | 0 | 3 | 0 | 2 | 0 | 20 | 0 |
| Exeter City | 1988–89 | Fourth Division | 21 | 0 | 0 | 0 | 0 | 0 | 0 | 0 | 21 | 0 |
| Exeter City | 1989–90 | Fourth Division | 30 | 7 | 1 | 0 | 5 | 1 | 0 | 0 | 36 | 8 |
| Exeter City | 1990–91 | Third Division | 41 | 6 | 1 | 0 | 2 | 1 | 4 | 0 | 48 | 7 |
| Exeter City | Total | | 92 | 13 | 2 | 0 | 7 | 2 | 4 | 0 | 105 | 15 |
| Notts County | 1991–92 | First Division | 29 | 1 | 2 | 0 | 2 | 0 | 2 | 0 | 35 | 1 |
| Notts County | 1992–93 | First Division | 2 | 0 | 1 | 0 | 0 | 0 | 0 | 0 | 3 | 0 |
| Notts County | Total | | 31 | 1 | 3 | 0 | 2 | 0 | 2 | 0 | 38 | 1 |
| Plymouth Argyle (loan) | 1992–93 | Second Division | 5 | 0 | 0 | 0 | 0 | 0 | 1 | 0 | 6 | 0 |
| Birmingham City | 1992–93 | First Division | 11 | 0 | 0 | 0 | 0 | 0 | 0 | 0 | 11 | 0 |
| Birmingham City | 1993–94 | First Division | 34 | 0 | 1 | 0 | 4 | 0 | 0 | 0 | 39 | 0 |
| Birmingham City | 1994–95 | Second Division | 3 | 0 | 0 | 0 | 1 | 0 | 0 | 0 | 4 | 0 |
| Birmingham City | Total | | 48 | 0 | 1 | 0 | 5 | 0 | 0 | 0 | 54 | 0 |
| Bristol City | 1994–95 | First Division | 19 | 1 | 1 | 0 | 0 | 0 | 0 | 0 | 20 | 1 |
| Bristol City | 1995–96 | Second Division | 18 | 1 | 1 | 0 | 3 | 0 | 3 | 0 | 25 | 1 |
| Bristol City | Total | | 37 | 2 | 2 | 0 | 3 | 0 | 3 | 0 | 45 | 2 |
| Southampton | 1996–97 | Premier League | 29 | 1 | 0 | 0 | 6 | 3 | 0 | 0 | 35 | 4 |
| Southampton | 1997–98 | Premier League | 13 | 0 | 0 | 0 | 1 | 0 | 0 | 0 | 14 | 0 |
| Southampton | 1998–99 | Premier League | 4 | 0 | 0 | 0 | 0 | 0 | 0 | 0 | 4 | 0 |
| Southampton | 1999–2000 | Premier League | 1 | 0 | 0 | 0 | 0 | 0 | 0 | 0 | 1 | 0 |
| Southampton | 2000–01 | Premier League | 0 | 0 | 0 | 0 | 0 | 0 | 0 | 0 | 0 | 0 |
| Southampton | Total | | 47 | 1 | 0 | 0 | 7 | 3 | 0 | 0 | 54 | 4 |
| Stoke City (loan) | 1999–2000 | Second Division | 13 | 0 | 0 | 0 | 0 | 0 | 2 | 0 | 15 | 0 |
| Northampton Town (loan) | 2000–01 | Second Division | 10 | 0 | 0 | 0 | 0 | 0 | 0 | 0 | 10 | 0 |
| Swindon Town (loan) | 2000–01 | Second Division | 7 | 0 | 1 | 0 | 0 | 0 | 0 | 0 | 8 | 0 |
| Luton Town | 2000–01 | Second Division | 20 | 0 | 0 | 0 | 0 | 0 | 0 | 0 | 20 | 0 |
| Luton Town | 2001–02 | Third Division | 3 | 0 | 1 | 0 | 1 | 0 | 1 | 0 | 6 | 0 |
| Luton Town | Total | | 23 | 0 | 1 | 0 | 1 | 0 | 1 | 0 | 26 | 0 |
| Career total | | | 326 | 17 | 11 | 0 | 28 | 5 | 15 | 0 | 380 | 22 |

== Managerial statistics ==
As of match played 22 November 2025

Managerial record by team and tenure
| Team | From | To | Record | | | | |
| Team | From | To | G | W | D | L | Win % |
|---|---|---|---|---|---|---|---|
| Notts County (caretaker) | 29 December 2015 | 10 January 2016 | 1 | 0 | 0 | 1 | 0.00 |
| Yeovil Town (caretaker) | 26 August 2025 | 13 September 2025 | 4 | 2 | 0 | 2 | 50.00 |
| Yeovil Town | 22 September 2025 | 25 November 2025 | 12 | 3 | 2 | 7 | 25.00 |
| Total | | | 17 | 5 | 2 | 10 | 29.41 |

== Honours ==
Exeter City

- Football League Fourth Division: 1989–90

Stoke City

- Football League Trophy: 1999–2000
