= Luís Cavaco =

Portuguese footballer (born 1972)

Personal information
- Full name: Luís Miguel Pássaro Cavaco
- Date of birth: 1 March 1972 (age 54)
- Place of birth: Almada, Portugal
- Height: 1.74 m (5 ft 8 1/2 in)
- Position: Winger

Youth career
- 1982–1990: Almada

Senior career*
| Years | Team | Apps | (Gls) |
| 1990–1992 | Almada | | |
| 1992–1993 | Silves | | |
| 1993 | Estrela Amadora | 0 | (0) |
| 1993–1995 | Casa Pia | 33 | (11) |
| 1995–1996 | Estoril | 30 | (12) |
| 1996–1998 | Stockport County | 30 | (5) |
| 1998–1999 | Boavista | 1 | (0) |
| 1999–2002 | Farense | 55 | (2) |
| 2002–2003 | Felgueiras | 32 | (10) |
| 2003–2006 | Portimonense | 74 | (7) |
| Total | | 255 | (47) |
- * Club domestic league appearances and goals

Luís Miguel Pássaro Cavaco (born 1 March 1972) is a Portuguese retired professional footballer who played as a right winger.

== Football career ==
Born in Almada, Setúbal District, Cavaco spent his first five years as a senior in the lower leagues of his country. He belonged to C.F. Estrela da Amadora for a brief period of time, never appearing officially for the club and representing three other teams in this timeframe.

In the 1995–96 season, Cavaco excelled with G.D. Estoril Praia in the second division alongside Pauleta, with the pair combining for 30 league goals even though the Lisbon side could only rank in 12th position. Subsequently, he moved abroad with Stockport County in England, appearing sparingly as the team promoted from League One.

Released by the Hatters in summer of 1998, with competitive totals of 40 matches and seven goals, Cavaco returned to his country and joined Boavista F.C. in the Primeira Liga. In his only season with the Porto club his output consisted of 31 minutes in a 1–2 home loss against C.S. Marítimo – the league's last matchday – and he moved to fellow league team S.C. Farense for three further campaigns of relative playing time, suffering relegation in his last.

Cavaco retired from football in 2006 at the age of 34, after four years in division two with F.C. Felgueiras (one season) and Portimonense SC (three). After a short spell as assistant manager at C.D. Olivais e Moscavide, he went on to work as a security at a shopping mall.
