= 2000–01 Southampton F.C. season =

Southampton F.C.
2000–01 season
- Chairman: Rupert Lowe
- Manager: Glenn Hoddle (until 28 March 2001); Stuart Gray (from 30 March 2001)
- Stadium: The Dell
- FA Premier League: 10th
- FA Cup: Fifth round
- League Cup: Third round
- Top goalscorer: League: James Beattie (11); All: James Beattie (12)
- Highest home attendance: 15,252 v Arsenal (19 May 2001)
- Lowest home attendance: 8,802 v Mansfield Town (20 September 2000)
- Average home league attendance: 15,115
- Biggest win: 2–0 (multiple games); 3–1 v Sheffield Wednesday (27 January 2001)
- Biggest defeat: 0–5 v Manchester United (28 October 2000)
Home colours	Away colours	Third colours

The 2000–01 Southampton F.C. season was the club's 100th season of competitive football, their 31st (and 23rd consecutive) in the top flight of English football, and their ninth in the FA Premier League. Having achieved a relatively comfortable 15th-place finish the previous season, the club built on this to finish in the top half of the league for the first time in six years, ending the season 10th in the table just as they had done in 1994–95. After leading the club for the second half of the 1999–2000 season, Glenn Hoddle remained Southampton manager for most of the 2000–01 campaign, although he left in March 2001 and was replaced by Stuart Gray, who saw out the year. This was also the last season the club played at The Dell before moving to St Mary's Stadium.

Having made numerous changes to the squad after his arrival in January 2000, Hoddle signed only three new players in the summer transfer window: German striker Uwe Rösler, midfielder Mark Draper, and Ivory Coast striker Patrice Tano. Later in the season, Argentine winger Adrian Caceres and Romanian right-back Dan Petrescu also joined the club. Outgoings included left-back Patrick Colleter, centre-back Richard Dryden, and attacking midfielder Trond Egil Soltvedt. The Saints struggled in the league early on, spending a few weeks in the relegation zone; by the new year, however, they had made it up to the mid-table region, with a string of five wins ahead of Hoddle's departure taking them as high as 8th. Form dipped somewhat under temporary manager Gray.

Outside the league, Southampton reached the fifth round of the FA Cup for the first time in five seasons, but only reached the third round of the League Cup. In the FA Cup, the Saints beat First Division clubs Sheffield United and Sheffield Wednesday in the third and fourth rounds, respectively, edging past United with a 1–0 win and eliminating Wednesday with a 3–1 victory. In the fifth round they faced another second-flight side, Tranmere Rovers, who beat the Saints 4–3 in a replay (after a goalless draw at The Dell) by overcoming a 0–3 half-time deficit with four second-half goals. In the League Cup, the club made it past Third Division side Mansfield Town 5–1 on aggregate over two legs, before losing 0–1 to Premier League strugglers Coventry City in the third round.

Southampton used 25 players during the 2000–01 season and had 14 different goalscorers. James Beattie finished as the club's top goalscorer for the first time with 12 goals – 11 in the league and one in the FA Cup. Wayne Bridge and Claus Lundekvam made the most appearances for the club during the campaign, both playing in all but one of the team's 45 games across all three competitions. Bridge won the Southampton F.C. Player of the Season award at the end of the season. The average league attendance at The Dell during 2000–01 was 15,115. The highest attendance was 15,252 against Arsenal in the final competitive game at the stadium on the closing day of the league in May; the lowest was 8,802 against Mansfield Town in the League Cup in September.

== Background and transfers ==
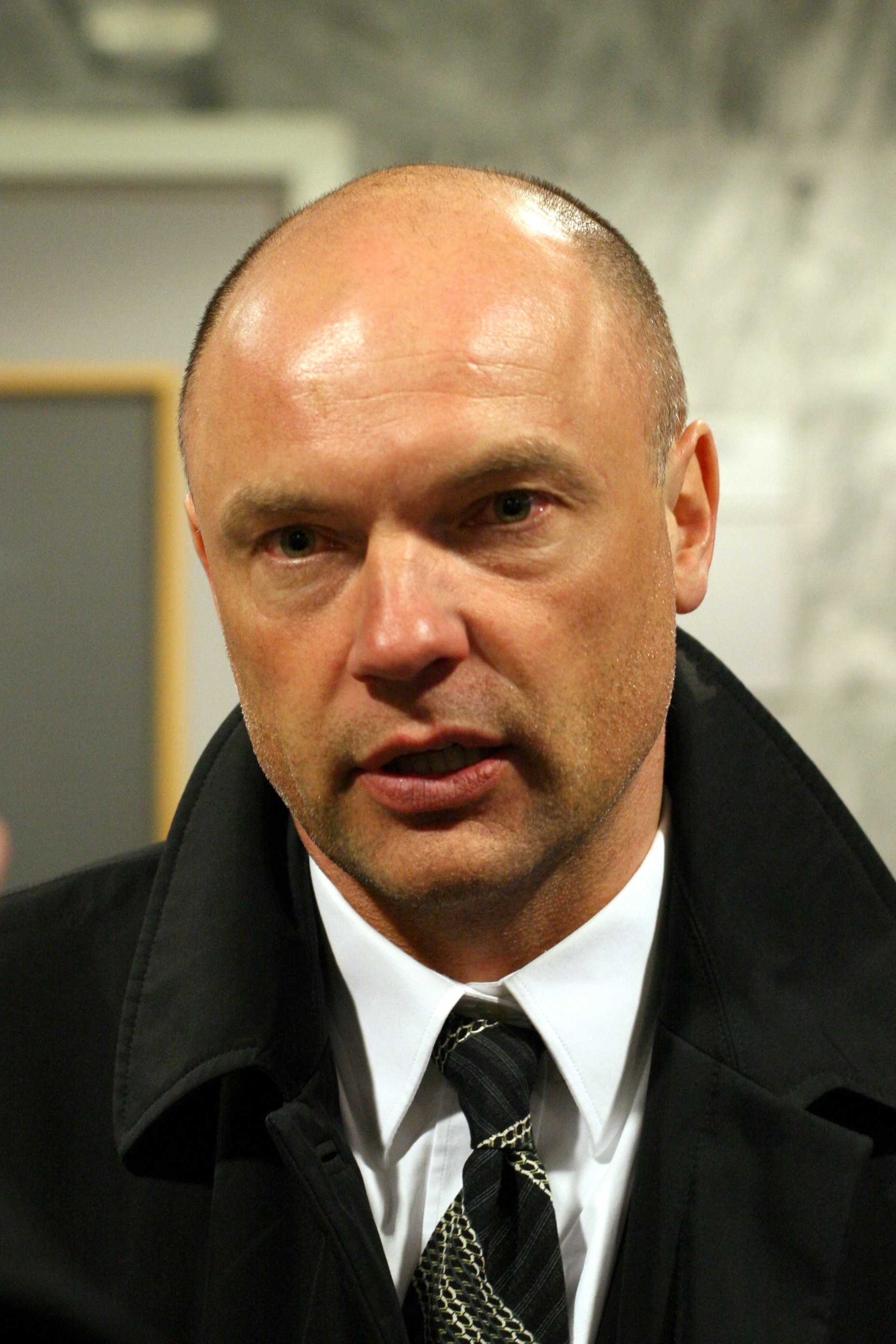
Southampton's first signing of the 2000–01 season was German striker Uwe Rösler, who joined on a free transfer in July.

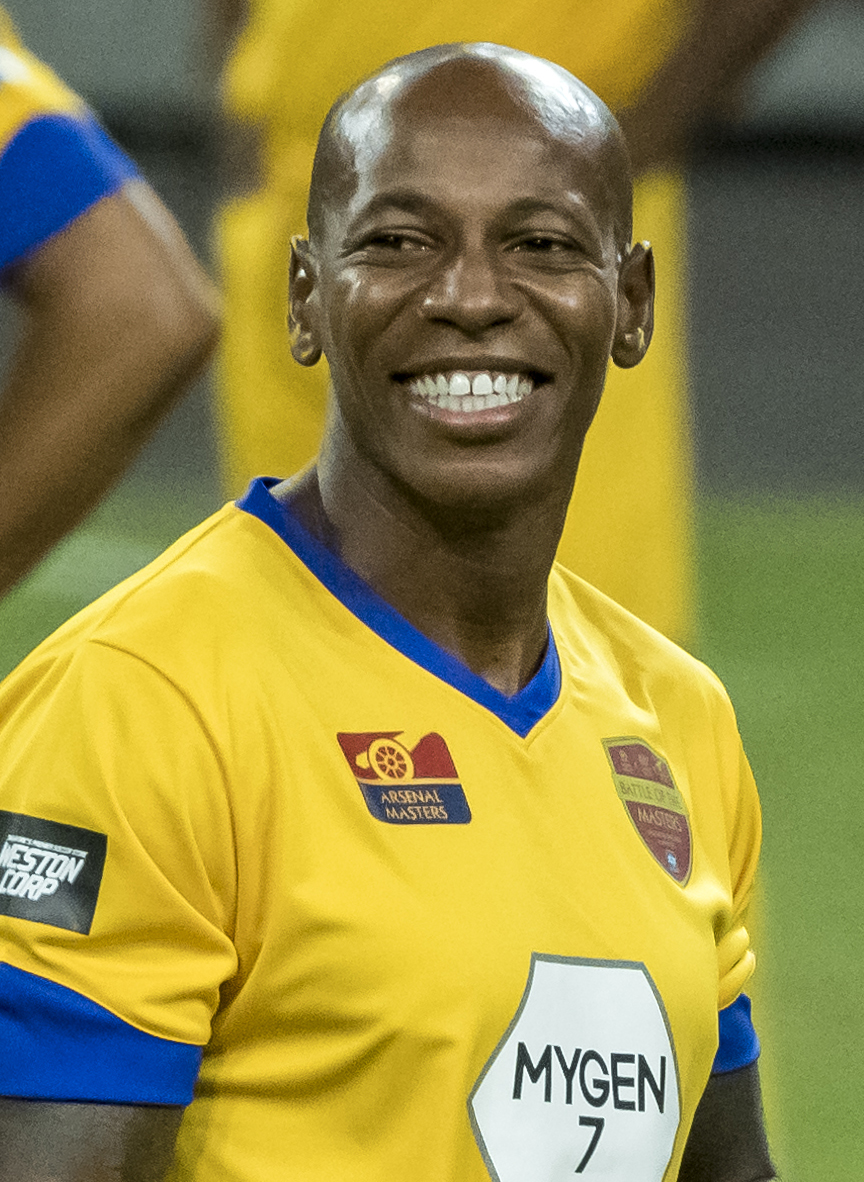
Luís Boa Morte spent the whole 2000–01 season out on loan at Fulham, who he would join on a permanent basis the following summer.

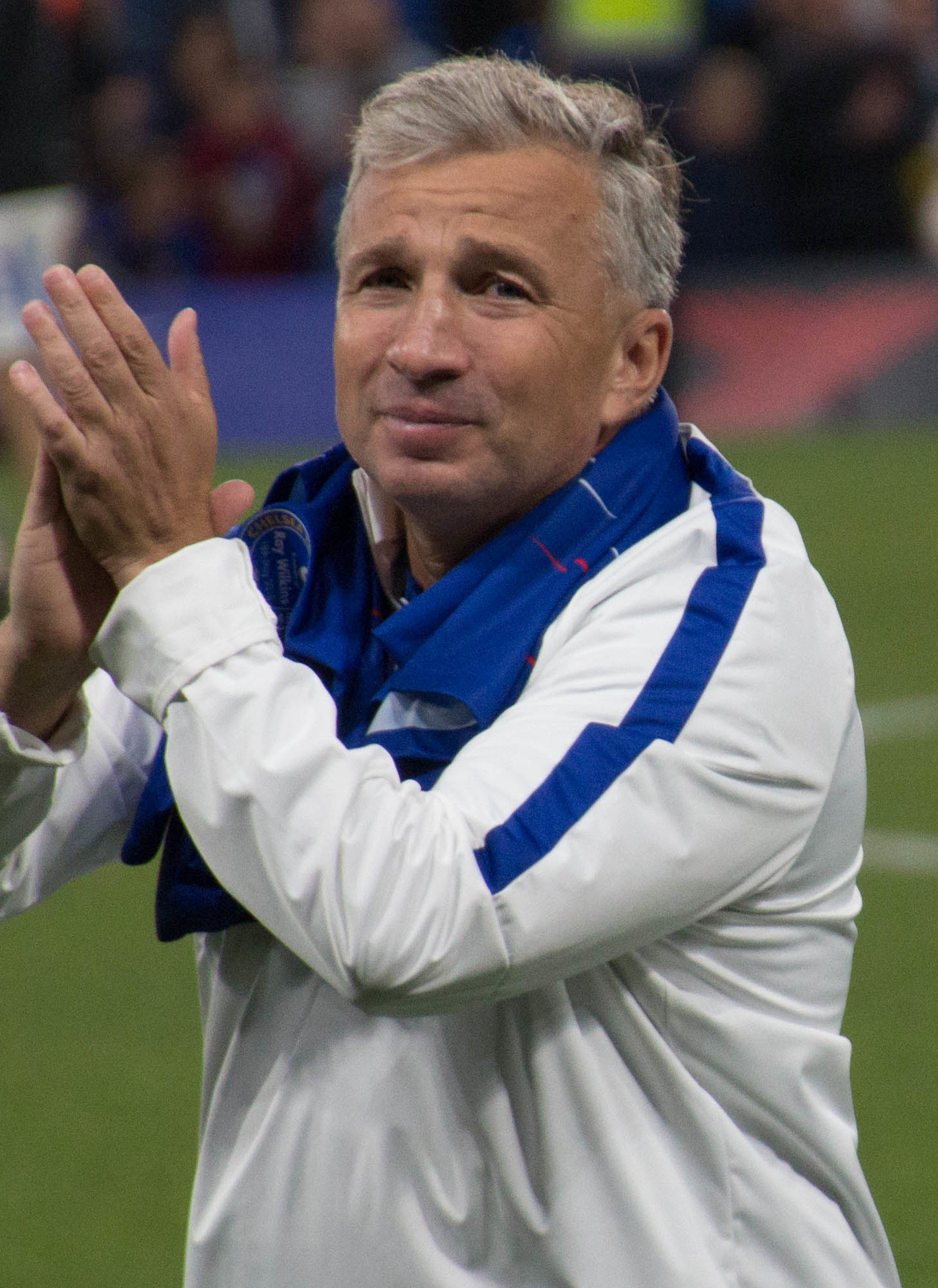
After initially snubbing the club in the summer, Romanian right-back Dan Petrescu joined the Saints in January 2001.

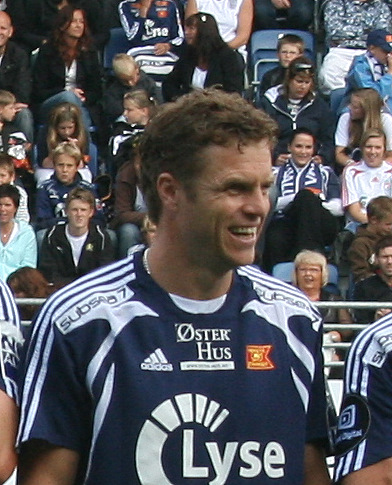
Trond Egil Soltvedt left Southampton in March 2001, having completed just shy of two full seasons at the club.

With their new stadium St Mary's Stadium now being built, Southampton had a relatively quiet summer transfer period ahead of the 2000–01 season. At the beginning of July, they signed German striker Uwe Rösler on a free transfer from Tennis Borussia Berlin, after the club had gone into bankruptcy. In an interview with BBC Radio Solent, Rösler credited manager Glenn Hoddle's "big plans for the club" as an important factor in his decision to move back to England after two years back playing in Germany. Two days later, the club signed another striker on a free transfer, bringing in 18-year-old Ivory Coast forward Patrice Tano from French side Monaco after he spent a few days with the club during their pre-season preparations. The final signing prior to the season's start was midfielder Mark Draper, who joined from Aston Villa for a fee of £1.5 million. Initially priced at £2 million, Draper eventually moved for a reduced price of £1.25 million raising to £1.5 million based on appearances. Portuguese winger Luís Boa Morte was loaned out for the whole season to Fulham.

Shortly after the start of the league campaign, young striker Shayne Bradley moved to Third Division club Mansfield Town for a club record fee of £100,000, having failed to break into the top-flight side's first team. August also saw the retirement of three Saints players from professional football – left-back John Beresford was forced to leave due to a cruciate ligament injury suffered in the opening game of the 1998–99 season, since which he had only managed to make three substitute appearances for the club; attacking midfielder David Hughes was forced to step down after failing to recover from a knee injury suffered in a pre-season match ahead of the 1999–2000 season; and defensive midfielder David Howells left after nearly 18 months without an appearance, due to the recurrence of an old knee injury suffered prior to joining Southampton. In September, Argentine winger Adrian Caceres joined from Australian side Perth for £25,000, while centre-back Richard Dryden moved to Northampton Town for two months in the first of two loan spells during the season.

During October, Portuguese winger Dani Rodrigues spent a few weeks on loan at Bristol City in the Second Division, before breaking his ankle and being forced to return to Southampton for rehabilitation. The next month, French left-back Patrick Colleter left Southampton on a free transfer, having failed to establish himself in the first team. He moved to Cannes after a short trial, having been "openly critical" of Hoddle and being prevented from playing even for the reserve side as a result. Around the same time, new signing Patrice Tano was released due to issues with his passport and work permit, which forced him to move back to France. Stuart Ripley was loaned out to First Division side Barnsley until January, while Dryden started his second loan spell – this time at Swindon Town in the Second Division. Trainee Daniel Webb was sold to Southend United in December.

After Christmas, the club signed Romanian right-back Dan Petrescu from Premier League strugglers Bradford City, paying a "nominal fee" for the defender. Petrescu had originally planned to sign for the Saints from Chelsea at the beginning of the season after falling out with manager Gianluca Vialli, however an £800,000 deal fell through after the defender could not agree to personal terms. The eventual move reunited Petrescu with Hoddle, under whom he had played at Chelsea a few years earlier. In February, Richard Dryden finally made a permanent move away from Southampton, sold to Luton Town in the Second Division for free. Later that month, out-of-favour midfielder Trond Egil Soltvedt was sent out on loan to Sheffield Wednesday for a month, before he was signed permanently in March alongside loanee Stuart Ripley, who joined until the end of the season.

Players transferred in

Name	Nationality	Pos.	Club	Date	Fee	Ref.
Uwe Rösler	Germany	FW	(Germany) Tennis Borussia Berlin	3 July 2000	Free	
Patrice Tano	Ivory Coast	FW	(France) Monaco	5 July 2000	Free	
Mark Draper	England	MF	(England) Aston Villa	17 July 2000	£1,250,000	
Adrian Caceres	Argentina	MF	(Australia) Perth	1 September 2000	£25,000	
Dan Petrescu	Romania	DF	(England) Bradford City	12 January 2001	Nominal	

Players transferred out

Name	Nationality	Pos.	Club	Date	Fee	Ref.
Shayne Bradley	England	FW	(England) Mansfield Town	22 August 2000	£100,000	
Patrick Colleter	France	DF	(France) Cannes	November 2000	Free	
Daniel Webb	England	DF	(England) Southend United	4 December 2000	£10,000	
Richard Dryden	England	DF	(England) Luton Town	2 February 2001	Free	
Matthew Davies	England	DF	(England) Woking	2 March 2001	Free	
Trond Egil Soltvedt	Norway	MF	(England) Sheffield Wednesday	22 March 2001	Nominal	

Players loaned out

Name	Nationality	Pos.	Club	Date from	Date to	Ref.
Luís Boa Morte	Portugal	MF	(England) Fulham	30 July 2000	End of season	
Richard Dryden	England	DF	(England) Northampton Town	9 September 2000	9 November 2000	
Dani Rodrigues	Portugal	MF	(England) Bristol City	2 October 2000	25 October 2000	
Stuart Ripley	England	MF	(England) Barnsley	8 November 2000	16 January 2001	
Richard Dryden	England	DF	(England) Swindon Town	21 November 2000	26 January 2001	
Trond Egil Soltvedt	Norway	MF	(England) Sheffield Wednesday	12 February 2001	21 March 2001	
Stuart Ripley	England	MF	(England) Sheffield Wednesday	22 March 2001	End of season	

Players released

Name	Nationality	Pos.	Date	Details	Ref.
Patrice Tano	Ivory Coast	FW	November 2000	Released due to work permit issues, subsequently joined Belgian side Beveren	

Players retired

Name	Nationality	Pos.	Date	Details	Ref.
John Beresford	England	DF	August 2000	Retired due to a cruciate ligament injury, later played for several non-league clubs	
David Hughes	England	MF	August 2000	Retired due to a knee injury, later worked as a coach and manager	
David Howells	England	MF	August 2000	Retired due to a knee injury, later played for several non-league clubs	

== Pre-season friendlies ==
Ahead of the 2000–01 season, Southampton played seven pre-season friendlies. The first saw the Saints travel to Huish Park to face Conference side Yeovil Town in a testimonial for goalkeeper Tony Pennock. The top-flight visitors won the match 2–0, with Marians Pahars opening the scoring after 11 minutes with a header from a Matt Le Tissier cross, before James Beattie made it two just after the half-time break with a header from a Hassan Kachloul corner. Four days later, the club played another testimonial, for Bournemouth midfielder Russell Beardsmore. The Second Division hosts opened the scoring after just two minutes through guest player Ryan Giggs, before going 2–0 up within nine minutes through Chukki Eribenne. Ten minutes before the break, Beattie pulled one back for the Saints, before Kevin Gibbens scored after just five minutes on as a substitute to make it 2–2; the score remained level, although it was reported by the Southern Daily Echo that the Premier League side "could have had six in the second half".

In their third pre-season game, Southampton lost 1–3 at Second Division side Swindon Town. Beattie scored the only goal of the game for the visitors, taking his tally to three in three during pre-season. Against another third-flight side two days later, the Saints drew 1–1 with Reading at the Madejski Stadium. Home debutant Keith Jones opened the scoring in the 21st minute with a "spectacular volley", and it took the visitors until "virtually the last kick of the game" to equalise, with substitute Garry Monk tapping in from close range. Another draw followed in the next game against First Division side Gillingham, with goalkeeper Neil Moss making numerous saves – including a penalty – to keep a clean sheet in the goalless draw. The Saints picked up their first win over league opponents a few days later, beating First Division side Wolverhampton Wanderers 2–1 at Molineux Stadium. After going behind within three minutes, the Saints responded in the 18th minute when Kachloul set up Pahars, before the Latvian returned the favour and set up the Moroccan just after the break for a second goal. The final pre-season game, and only one at The Dell, saw the Saints lose 1–2 to Spanish side Real Sociedad, with Pahars scoring the consolation for the hosts.

21 July 2000 Tony Pennock Testimonial	Yeovil Town	0–2	Southampton	Yeovil
19:45 BST			Pahars 11'; Beattie 49'	Stadium: Huish Park; Attendance: 2,471

25 July 2000 Russell Beardsmore Testimonial	Bournemouth	2–2	Southampton	Bournemouth
	Giggs 2'; Eribenne 9'		Beattie 35'; Gibbens 37'	Stadium: Dean Court; Attendance: 6,398; Referee: Darren Spicer

27 July 2000 Friendly	Swindon Town	3–1	Southampton	Swindon
			Beattie	Stadium: County Ground

29 July 2000 Friendly	Reading	1–1	Southampton	Reading
	Jones 21'		Monk 90'	Stadium: Madejski Stadium; Attendance: 5,916; Referee: Lee Cable

2 August 2000 Friendly	Gillingham	0–0	Southampton	Gillingham
				Stadium: Priestfield Stadium

5 August 2000 Friendly	Wolverhampton Wanderers	1–2	Southampton	Wolverhampton
	Sinton 3'		Pahars 18'; Kachloul 53'	Stadium: Molineux Stadium

12 August 2000 Friendly	Southampton	1–2	(Spain) Real Sociedad	Southampton
	Pahars			Stadium: The Dell

== FA Premier League ==
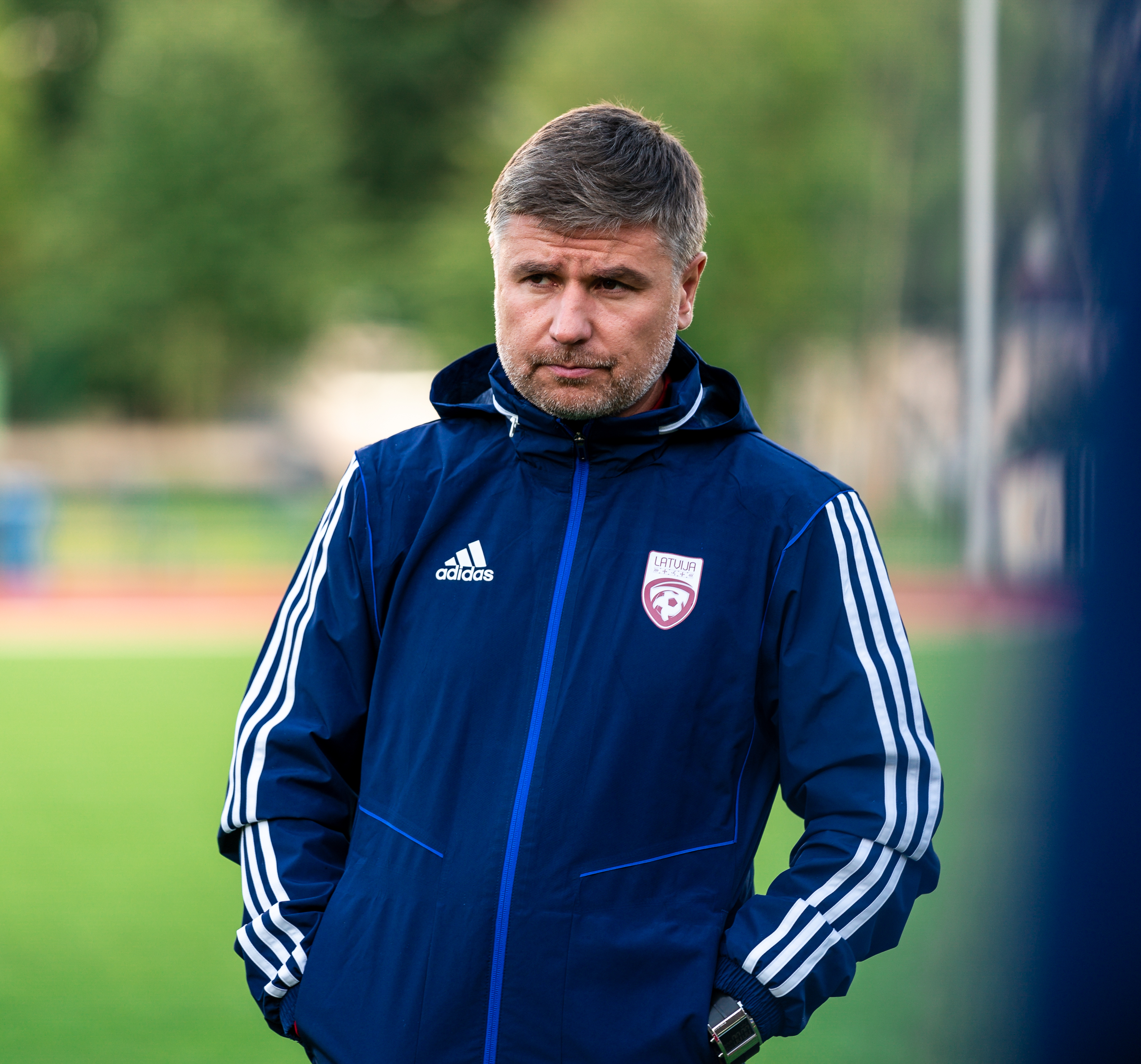
Marians Pahars was the club's top scorer for the first few months of the season.

Southampton's 2000–01 season started poorly, as they picked up just three points from their first five fixtures, starting second from bottom of the Premier League table. On the opening day, the club lost an early two-goal lead gained by a Hassan Kachloul brace to draw 2–2 with Derby County, with Kachloul coming close to completing a hat-trick in injury time. After losing 1–2 at home to Coventry City the next week, the Saints overcame a three-goal deficit against Liverpool to gain a point in a 3–3 draw, with goals from Tahar El Khalej and Marians Pahars in the last five minutes securing the point. A draw and a loss at Charlton Athletic and Leicester City, respectively, were followed by the side's first two victories, as they beat 3rd-place Newcastle United 2–0 at home (courtesy of a Pahars double) and Bradford City 1–0 at Valley Parade (courtesy of an own goal).

Despite climbing up to 8th in the table on the back of their first two wins of the campaign, Southampton quickly dropped in form again, picking up just one point from their next four games, in a 1–1 draw with Everton. The run culminated in the club's heaviest defeat of the season, as they lost 0–5 to reigning champions Manchester United at Old Trafford, with Andy Cole scoring twice and Teddy Sheringham completing a hat-trick. Now back in the relegation zone, the Saints beat top six side Chelsea 3–2 the next week, with James Beattie securing all three points with a "thunderous" free-kick in injury time, after Chelsea had fought back from a two-goal deficit late on. Beattie scored again in a 2–2 draw at Sunderland, then added another two in a two-minute spell against Aston Villa, which decided the game. In December, all charges against former manager Dave Jones, which had led to his initially temporary leave of absence, were dropped. He did not return to Southampton, however, as Glenn Hoddle had been given a permanent contract.

After winning both of their games with clean sheets between Christmas and new year (2–0 against Tottenham Hotspur and 1–0 against Derby County), Southampton sat 12th in the Premier League table. They started 2001 with a loss at Anfield, however, with a late Markus Babbel header breaking a deadlock for a 2–1 Liverpool win. Two goalless draws followed, before a 1–0 win at home to Leicester City in which Dan Petrescu scored the only goal of the game in his full debut since joining a few weeks earlier. The victory marked the start of Southampton's best run of form all season, as they won five games in a row without conceding a single goal – after Leicester, the Saints beat four teams in the bottom six of the table: 2–0 against Bradford City (Pahars and Beattie scored), 1–0 away at both Middlesbrough (Mark Draper with his only goal of the season) and Manchester City (Petrescu scoring again), and 1–0 at home to Everton (thanks to a Jo Tessem strike). After the run, the club had climbed to 8th in the table, three points off the top five.

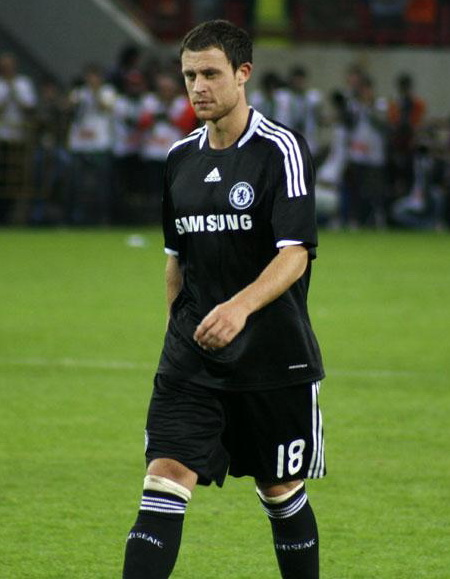
Wayne Bridge started every league game in 2000–01 and was named Southampton F.C. Player of the Season.

In late-March, shortly after George Graham was sacked as Tottenham Hotspur manager, Hoddle left Southampton after holding talks to take over the vacated role at his former club. He was confirmed as the new Tottenham boss on 30 March, claiming that "It wasn't an easy decision to leave Southampton because I have put in a lot of hard work". Former Saints midfielder Stuart Gray, who had worked as first-team coach under Hoddle, took over the same day as caretaker manager for the remainder of the season.

Gray's tenure as Southampton manager started poorly, as the club lost their first three games under his management and dropped back down into the bottom half of the Premier League table. After not conceding a goal since New Year's Day, they lost 0–3 at home to Ipswich Town, who were third in the league at the time, at the start of April. All three goals were scored by Marcus Stewart, the club's top scorer, with club historians describing the Saints as being "out-passed, out-classed and manoeuvred". Another defeat without scoring followed five days later, as 4th-place Leeds United beat the Saints 2–0 at Elland Road with goals from Harry Kewell and Robbie Keane either side of the break. 6th-placed Chelsea followed suit the next week at Stamford Bridge, with Gus Poyet scoring the only goal in a 1–0 win just before half-time. The Saints were now 12th in the league.

The team picked up their first point under the new manager with a goalless draw at Aston Villa, followed after a 0–1 home loss to Sunderland (in which Beattie saw a goal "wrongly ruled offside", according to club historians) by a 1–1 draw with Newcastle United, the point saved by Marians Pahars in the last ten minutes of the game. The club dropped down to 13th with a 0–3 loss at West Ham United in their final away game. Their final two fixtures of the season took place at The Dell, marking the final competitive games at the stadium before it was closed down. In the first, Southampton beat Manchester United (who were winning their third consecutive Premier League title) 2–1, with a Wes Brown own goal and a Pahars goal putting the hosts 2–0 up within half an hour (Ryan Giggs scored a consolation late in the second half). The win saw the club jump up to 10th in the league table.

In the final game of the season and final competitive game at The Dell, the Saints faced Arsenal who were finishing the league as runners-up to United. Ashley Cole gave the Gunners a 1–0 lead at half-time, but straight after the break Hassan Kachloul pulled one back. Freddie Ljungberg soon put the visitors back in front, before Kachloul responded quickly again to make it 2–2. Despite looking like it would finish a draw, the game was decided in the penultimate minute when Matt Le Tissier – making only his 8th appearance in the league campaign – scored a left-foot volley to give the hosts all three points. Fans and commentators described it as "fitting" for club captain and "legend" Le Tissier to score the last competitive goal at The Dell. Southampton's 10th-place finish gave them their best league result since the 1994–95 season under manager Alan Ball, when they finished in the same position.

=== List of match results ===
19 August 2000 1	Derby County	2–2	Southampton	Derby
15:00 BST	Blatsis (yellow card) 12'; Strupar 31'; Burton 48'	Report	Kachloul 15', 22'; El Khalej (yellow card)	Stadium: Pride Park Stadium; Attendance: 27,223; Referee: Andy D'Urso

23 August 2000 2	Southampton	1–2	Coventry City	Southampton
19:45 BST	Davies (yellow card) 10'; El Khalej (yellow card) 19'; Lundekvam (yellow card) 36'; Tessem 52'; Kachloul (yellow card) 67'; Rösler (yellow card) 70'	Report	Bellamy 19' (pen.), (yellow card) 22'; Palmer (yellow card) 29'; Williams (yellow card) 29'; Roussel 61'	Stadium: The Dell; Attendance: 14,801; Referee: Paul Taylor

26 August 2000 3	Southampton	3–3	Liverpool	Southampton
15:00 BST	Pahars 73', 90+2'; El Khalej 85'	Report	Owen 24', 64'; Hyppiä 55'	Stadium: The Dell; Attendance: 15,202; Referee: Jeff Winter

6 September 2000 4	Charlton Athletic	1–1	Southampton	London
20:00 BST	Brown (yellow card) 26' (yellow-red card) 59'; Rufus (yellow card) 32'; Kishishev (yellow card) 68'; Johansson 82'	Report	Rösler (yellow card) 56'; Draper (yellow card) 64'; Marsden (yellow card) 68'; Pahars 79'	Stadium: The Valley; Attendance: 20,043; Referee: Mark Halsey

9 September 2000 5	Leicester City	1–0	Southampton	Leicester
15:00 BST	Taggart 66'	Report		Stadium: Filbert Street; Attendance: 18,366; Referee: Mike Dean

16 September 2000 6	Southampton	2–0	Newcastle United	Southampton
15:00 BST	Pahars 47', 61'	Report		Stadium: The Dell; Attendance: 15,221; Referee: Barry Knight

23 September 2000 7	Bradford City	0–1	Southampton	Bradford
15:00 BST	Petrescu (yellow card) 45'; Ward (yellow card) 56'; Windass (yellow card) 89'	Report	Halle 29' (o.g.); Dodd (yellow card) 90'	Stadium: Valley Parade; Attendance: 16,163; Referee: Steve Dunn

30 September 2000 8	Southampton	1–3	Middlesbrough	Southampton
15:00 BST	Kachloul (yellow card) 71'; Pahars 81'; Beattie (yellow card) 89'	Report	Bokšić 17', 82'; Festa 32'; O'Neill (yellow card) 62'; Karembeu (yellow card) 69'	Stadium: The Dell; Attendance: 14,903; Referee: Graham Poll

14 October 2000 9	Everton	1–1	Southampton	Liverpool
15:00 BST	Gascoigne (yellow card) 8'; Ball 81' (pen.)	Report	Kachloul (yellow card) 14'; Marsden (yellow card) 14'; Davies (yellow card) 52'; Dodd 76'	Stadium: Goodison Park; Attendance: 29,491; Referee: David Elleray

23 October 2000 10	Southampton	0–2	Manchester City	Southampton
20:00 BST	El Khalej (yellow card) 57'	Report	Dickov 38', (yellow card) 90'; Howey (yellow card) 55'; Tiatto 90+1'	Stadium: The Dell; Attendance: 15,056; Referee: Alan Wiley

28 October 2000 11	Manchester United	5–0	Southampton	Manchester
15:00 GMT	Cole 9', 73'; Sheringham 45', 51', 55'	Report		Stadium: Old Trafford; Attendance: 67,581; Referee: Andy D'Urso

4 November 2000 12	Southampton	3–2	Chelsea	Southampton
15:00 GMT	Beattie 3', 90+1', (yellow card) 31'; Pahars (yellow card) 32'; Tessem 37'; Marsden (yellow card) 45'; El Khalej (yellow card) 70'	Report	Wise (yellow card) 45', (goal) 69'; Leboeuf (yellow card) 50'; Poyet 78'	Stadium: The Dell; Attendance: 15,236; Referee: Jeff Winter

11 November 2000 13	Sunderland	2–2	Southampton	Sunderland
15:00 GMT	Quinn 23'; Thome (yellow card) 71'; Hutchison 80'	Report	Beattie 12'; Lundekvam (yellow card) 68'; Richards 89'	Stadium: Stadium of Light; Attendance: 45,064; Referee: Mike Dean

18 November 2000 14	Southampton	2–0	Aston Villa	Southampton
15:00 GMT	Beattie 22', 24'	Report		Stadium: The Dell; Attendance: 14,979; Referee: Peter Jones

25 November 2000 15	Southampton	2–3	West Ham United	Southampton
15:00 GMT	El Khalej (yellow card) 12'; Oakley 20'; Beattie 53'	Report	Winterburn (yellow card) 16'; Štimac (yellow card) 32'; Kanouté 41'; Pearce 43'; Sinclair 69'	Stadium: The Dell; Attendance: 15,232; Referee: Steve Bennett

2 December 2000 16	Arsenal	1–0	Southampton	London
15:00 GMT	Lundekvam 85' (o.g.)	Report	Davies (yellow card) 38'; Kachloul (yellow card) 57'	Stadium: Arsenal Stadium; Attendance: 38,036; Referee: Steve Dunn

9 December 2000 17	Southampton	1–0	Leeds United	Southampton
15:00 GMT	Beattie 43'; Oakley (yellow card) 74'; Kachloul (yellow card) 81' (yellow-red card) 85'; Draper (yellow card) 85'	Report	Bakke (yellow card) 13'; Woodgate (yellow card) 77'; Dacourt (yellow card) 80'; Smith (yellow card)	Stadium: The Dell; Attendance: 15,225; Referee: Paul Durkin

16 December 2000 18	Ipswich Town	3–1	Southampton	Ipswich
15:00 GMT	Scowcroft 48'; Armstrong 51'; Venus (yellow card) 59'; Bridge 90' (o.g.)	Report	Beattie 3'; Davies (yellow card) 35'; Dodd (yellow card) 47'	Stadium: Portman Road; Attendance: 22,228; Referee: Barry Knight

22 December 2000 19	Coventry City	1–1	Southampton	Coventry
19:45 GMT	Thompson 33', (yellow card) 75'	Report	Draper (yellow card) 37'; Tessem 51'	Stadium: Highfield Road; Attendance: 18,090; Referee: Alan Wiley

27 December 2000 20	Southampton	2–0	Tottenham Hotspur	Southampton
20:00 GMT	Beattie 38'; Davies 40'; El Khalej (yellow card) 75'	Report	Clemence (yellow card) 18'; Campbell (yellow card) 20'; Anderton (yellow card) 72'	Stadium: The Dell; Attendance: 15,237; Referee: David Elleray

30 December 2000 21	Southampton	1–0	Derby County	Southampton
15:00 GMT	Beattie 73'	Report	Johnson (yellow card) 73'; Burley (yellow card) 89'	Stadium: The Dell; Attendance: 15,075; Referee: Andy D'Urso

1 January 2001 22	Liverpool	2–1	Southampton	Liverpool
15:00 GMT	Gerrard 12'; Babbel 86'	Report	Soltvedt 20'; Rösler (yellow card) 90'	Stadium: Anfield; Attendance: 38,474; Referee: Dermot Gallagher

13 January 2001 23	Southampton	0–0	Charlton Athletic	Southampton
15:00 GMT		Report		Stadium: The Dell; Attendance: 15,220; Referee: Stephen Lodge

20 January 2001 24	Tottenham Hotspur	0–0	Southampton	London
15:00 GMT		Report	Richards (yellow card) 82'	Stadium: White Hart Lane; Attendance: 36,095; Referee: Clive Wilkes

31 January 2001 25	Southampton	1–0	Leicester City	Southampton
19:45 GMT	Petrescu 79'	Report	Guppy (yellow card) 28'; Elliott (yellow card) 59'; Izzet (yellow card) 86'	Stadium: The Dell; Attendance: 14,909; Referee: Steve Bennett

10 February 2001 26	Southampton	2–0	Bradford City	Southampton
15:00 GMT	Pahars 60'; Beattie 63'	Report	Windass (yellow card) 86'	Stadium: The Dell; Attendance: 14,651; Referee: Graham Poll

24 February 2001 27	Middlesbrough	0–1	Southampton	Middlesbrough
15:00 GMT	Ince (yellow card) 53'	Report	Draper 49'	Stadium: Riverside Stadium; Attendance: 28,725; Referee: Neale Barry

3 March 2001 28	Manchester City	0–1	Southampton	Manchester
15:00 GMT	Howey (yellow card) 84'	Report	El Khalej (yellow card) 27'; Petrescu 55'	Stadium: Maine Road; Attendance: 33,990; Referee: Jeff Winter

17 March 2001 29	Southampton	1–0	Everton	Southampton
15:00 GMT	Tessem 58'; Bridge (yellow card) 82'; Beattie (yellow card) 85'	Report	Pistone (yellow card) 90'	Stadium: The Dell; Attendance: 15,251; Referee: Mark Halsey

2 April 2001 30	Southampton	0–3	Ipswich Town	Southampton
20:00 BST	Beattie (yellow card) 37'; Le Tissier (yellow card) 87'	Report	Stewart 33', 68', 71' (pen.); Reuser (yellow card) 59'	Stadium: The Dell; Attendance: 15,244; Referee: Alan Wiley

7 April 2001 31	Leeds United	2–0	Southampton	Leeds
15:00 BST	Kewell 10'; Keane 72'	Report		Stadium: Elland Road; Attendance: 39,267; Referee: Jeff Winter

14 April 2001 32	Chelsea	1–0	Southampton	London
15:00 BST	Terry (yellow card) 23'; Poyet 43'; Jokanović (yellow card) 61'; Melchiot (yellow card) 84'	Report	Beattie (yellow card) 6'; Draper (yellow card) 67'; Tessem (yellow card) 74'	Stadium: Stamford Bridge; Attendance: 35,136; Referee: Clive Wilkes

21 April 2001 33	Aston Villa	0–0	Southampton	Birmingham
15:00 BST	Hendrie (yellow card) 43'	Report	Draper (yellow card) 7'; Davies (yellow card) 33'	Stadium: Villa Park; Attendance: 29,336; Referee: Jeff Winter

28 April 2001 34	Southampton	0–1	Sunderland	Southampton
15:00 BST	Davies (yellow card) 85'; Kachloul (yellow card) 90'	Report	Kilbane 54'; Hutchison (yellow card) 64'	Stadium: The Dell; Attendance: 15,249; Referee: Alan Wiley

1 May 2001 35	Newcastle United	1–1	Southampton	Newcastle upon Tyne
20:00 BST	Gallacher 26'; LuaLua (yellow card) 38'; Speed (yellow card) 71'	Report	Davies (yellow card) 34'; Pahars 81'	Stadium: St James' Park; Attendance: 50,439; Referee: Stephen Lodge

5 May 2001 36	West Ham United	3–0	Southampton	London
15:00 BST	Pearce (yellow card) 34'; Foxe (yellow card) 57'; Cole 59'; Di Canio 70'; Kanouté 90'	Report	Lundekvam (yellow card) 12'; Davies (yellow card) 35'	Stadium: Boleyn Ground; Attendance: 26,041; Referee: Clive Wilkes

13 May 2001 37	Southampton	2–1	Manchester United	Southampton
15:00 BST	Brown 11' (o.g.); Pahars 15'; Marsden (yellow card) 68'	Report	Johnsen (yellow card) 27'; Giggs 71'	Stadium: The Dell; Attendance: 15,246; Referee: Jeff Winter

19 May 2001 38	Southampton	3–2	Arsenal	Southampton
15:00 BST	Davies (yellow card) 18'; Kachloul 46', 61'; Le Tissier 89'	Report	Cole 28', (yellow card) 47'; Vieira (yellow card) 45'; Ljungberg 54'	Stadium: The Dell; Attendance: 15,252; Referee: Paul Taylor

=== Final league table ===
Pos	Team	Pld	W	D	L	GF	GA	GD	Pts	Qualification or relegation
8	Aston Villa	38	13	15	10	46	43	+3	54	Qualification for the Intertoto Cup third round
9	Charlton Athletic	38	14	10	14	50	57	−7	52	
10	Southampton	38	14	10	14	40	48	−8	52	
11	Newcastle United	38	14	9	15	44	50	−6	51	Qualification for the Intertoto Cup third round
12	Tottenham Hotspur	38	13	10	15	47	54	−7	49	

Source: RSSSF
Rules for classification: 1) points; 2) goal difference; 3) number of goals scored.

=== Results by matchday ===
Round	1	2	3	4	5	6	7	8	9	10	11	12	13	14	15	16	17	18	19	20	21	22	23	24	25	26	27	28	29	30	31	32	33	34	35	36	37	38
Ground	A	H	H	A	A	H	A	H	A	H	A	H	A	H	H	A	H	A	A	H	H	A	H	A	H	H	A	A	H	H	A	A	A	H	A	A	H	H
Result	D	L	D	D	L	W	W	L	D	L	L	W	D	W	L	L	W	L	D	W	W	L	D	D	W	W	W	W	W	L	L	L	D	L	D	L	W	W
Position	9	18	18	18	19	14	8	12	16	17	18	14	15	15	15	15	15	15	15	14	12	12	14	14	12	12	10	9	8	10	11	12	11	12	12	13	10	10

Source: 11v11.com
A = Away; H = Home; W = Win; D = Draw; L = Loss

== FA Cup ==
Southampton entered the 2000–01 FA Cup in the third round against First Division side Sheffield United. The top-flight hosts came closest to opening the scoring in the first half, with Jo Tessem, Kevin Davies and James Beattie all failing to convert chances at various points. The second half started in much the same way, which eventually resulted in the Saints winning a penalty when Beattie was brought down by goalkeeper Simon Tracey. The penalty was converted by Jason Dodd, after which Bobby Ford was sent off amongst protests by the visitors against the spot kick. Southampton held on and progressed to the fourth round, where they were drawn at home again to another First Division side, Sheffield United's closest rivals Sheffield Wednesday. The Saints took the lead early on through Davies, who headed in a rebound from his own half-volley saved by Kevin Pressman. Wednesday responded strongly and eventually equalised shortly after the hour mark, when Andy Booth headed in a long throw-in to make it 1–1. The tide turned again late in the game, when a Booth handball led to a penalty for the Saints, which Dodd again converted for 2–1, before Beattie completed a win with a header in the last minute.

A third First Division side awaited Southampton in the fifth round, as the Saints faced Tranmere Rovers at The Dell. The hosts appeared to have opened the scoring after 11 minutes when Dean Richards headed in from a corner, however it was judged to be offside and disallowed. Another offside decision prevented a goal for the Saints around 20 minutes later, when Hassan Kachloul scored from a Marians Pahars pass, and the sides ultimately went into half-time goalless. Southampton continued to dominate after the break, but were unable to make any of their efforts count and it ended 0–0, forcing a replay at Prenton Park three days later. Southampton started the replay in much the same way as they had finished the initial tie, with Kachloul opening the scoring in the 12th minute with "the sweetest of shots into the top corner". Within 15 minutes it was 2–0 through Tessem, and on the stroke of half-time Richards made it three to give the visitors a huge advantage. Despite the three-goal deficit, Tranmere staged "one of the most dramatic comebacks in FA Cup history" in the second half to beat the Saints 4–3. The comeback started with a hat-trick scored within a 21-minute period by former Saints striker Paul Rideout, who scored his first two from a corner and his third from a free-kick to draw level. In the last ten minutes, shortly after Rideout's third goal, Tranmere secured a winner when Stuart Barlow converted a cross from Rideout.

6 January 2001 Round 3	Southampton	1–0	Sheffield United	Southampton
	Tahar El Khalej (yellow card) 67'; Dodd 73' (pen.)		Montgomery (yellow card) 44'; Ford (red card) 74'; Uhlenbeek (yellow card) 88'	Stadium: The Dell; Attendance: 14,158; Referee: David Elleray

27 January 2001 Round 4	Southampton	3–1	Sheffield Wednesday	Southampton
	Davies 11'; Dodd 80' (pen.); Beattie 90'		Hendon (yellow card) 52'; Booth 66'; Sibon (yellow card) 79'	Stadium: The Dell; Attendance: 15,251; Referee: Clive Wilkes

17 February 2001 Round 5	Southampton	0–0	Tranmere Rovers	Southampton
			Barlow (yellow card) 90'	Stadium: The Dell; Attendance: 15,232; Referee: Steve Dunn

20 February 2001 Round 5 Replay	Tranmere Rovers	4–3	Southampton	Birkenhead
	Rideout 59', 71', 80'; Barlow (yellow card) 81', (goal) 83'		Kachloul 12'; Beattie (yellow card) 22'; Tessem 26'; Richards 45'; Marsden (yellow card) 80'	Stadium: Prenton Park; Attendance: 12,910; Referee: Steve Dunn

== League Cup ==
Southampton entered the 2000–01 League Cup in the second round against Mansfield Town of the Third Division. The Saints beat the Stags 5–1 on aggregate over two legs, with Jo Tessem and Matt Le Tissier securing a 2–0 win at The Dell, before Uwe Rösler and Trond Egil Soltvedt (two) added a 3–1 victory at Field Mill. They faced fellow Premier League side Coventry City in the third round, losing 0–1 after a single goal from John Eustace late in extra time, despite enjoying the majority of chances on goal.

20 September 2000 Round 2 Leg 1	Southampton	2–0	Mansfield Town	Southampton
	Tessem 36'; Le Tissier 67'; Ripley (yellow card) 77'		Clarke (yellow card) 89'	Stadium: The Dell; Attendance: 8,802; Referee: Peter Walton

26 September 2000 Round 2 Leg 2	Mansfield Town	1–3 (1–5 agg.)	Southampton	Mansfield
	Clarke 55'		Rösler 32'; Soltvedt 44', 65'; Marsden (yellow card) 88'	Stadium: Field Mill; Attendance: 3,528; Referee: Anthony Bates

1 November 2000 Round 3	Southampton	0–1 (a.e.t.)	Coventry City	Southampton
	Kachloul (yellow card) 90'		Quinn (yellow card) 70'; Eustace 119'	Stadium: The Dell; Attendance: 11,809; Referee: Steve Dunn

== Other matches ==
Outside the league and cup competitions, Southampton played four additional matches during the 2000–01 season – two in the final stages of the campaign, two just after its conclusion. The first two took place in March against French side Le Havre, reportedly as a mechanism for manager Glenn Hoddle to "look at seniors returning to fitness and youngsters hoping to press their claims" during the final stages of the season. In the first tie, at Stade Jules Deschaseaux, the Saints broke the deadlock after just seven minutes when Uwe Rösler scored a "crisp drive"; however, goals either side of half-time from Thierry De Neef and Laurent Ciechelski put the hosts in front, before they secured a 3–1 win in the last minute courtesy of Patrick Revelles. Southampton lost the return fixture at The Dell by the same margin, with goals either side of the break from Thomas Deniaud and Karim Kerkar giving Le Havre the 2–0 win. Hoddle cancelled a plan weekend off for the players after the double loss, calling them "silly lads".

Three days after the end of the Premier League campaign, the Saints hosted a testimonial for right-back Jason Dodd against a team put together by kit manager Malcolm "Woggy" Taylor dubbed Woggy's Wanderers. Featuring a rotating cast of players on either side, the game ended in a 3–1 win to Taylor's side, with goals scored by former Saints players Steve Davis and Nicky Banger in the first half, followed by guest Dean Gaffney just before the end, who scored against goalkeeper Matt Le Tissier after a penalty by chairman Rupert Lowe had hit the crossbar. Russell Osman, who had retired from playing in 1996, scored the sole goal for the Saints just after half-time. The final game took place four days later, as Southampton hosted Brighton & Hove Albion (who had just won the Third Division title) for the final game at The Dell before its closure. The hosts won the friendly 1–0, with Uwe Rösler scoring the only goal of the game in the 13th minute. The game ended prematurely when home fans started a pitch invasion.

6 March 2001 Friendly	(France) Le Havre	3–1	Southampton	Le Havre, France
	De Neef 43'; Ciechelski 50'; Revelles 90'		Rösler 7'	Stadium: Stade Jules Deschaseaux

9 March 2001 Friendly	Southampton	0–2	(France) Le Havre	Southampton
			Deniaud 24'; Kerkar 49'	Stadium: The Dell

22 May 2001 Jason Dodd Testimonial	Southampton	1–3	Woggy's Wanderers	Southampton
	Osman 47'		Davis 15'; Banger 24'; Gaffney 88'	Stadium: The Dell; Attendance: 10,583; Referee: Darren Spicer

26 May 2001 Friendly	Southampton	1–0	Brighton & Hove Albion	Southampton
	Rösler 13'			Stadium: The Dell; Referee: Steve Tomlin

== Player details ==
Southampton used 25 players during the 2000–01 season, 14 of whom scored during the campaign. Five players made their debut appearances for the club, including three of their five first team signings (Mark Draper, Dan Petrescu, and Uwe Rösler), one player signed the previous season (Imants Bleidelis), and one player making the step up from youth to the first team (Ryan Ashford). One of these – Ashford – also made his last appearance for the Saints during the campaign, as did mid-season departee Trond Egil Soltvedt. Defenders Wayne Bridge and Claus Lundekvam made the most appearances during the season, playing in all but one of the club's 46 games. James Beattie finished as the club's top goalscorer for the first time, scoring 12 goals in all competitions. Bridge won the Southampton F.C. Player of the Season award.

=== Squad statistics ===
No.	Name	Pos.	Nat.	League		FA Cup		League Cup		Total		Discipline	
No.	Name	Pos.	Nat.	Apps.	Goals	Apps.	Goals	Apps.	Goals	Apps.	Goals	Yellow card	Red card
1	Paul Jones	GK	(Wales)	35	0	4	0	3	0	42	0	0	0
2	Jason Dodd	DF	(England)	29(2)	1	3	2	3	0	35(2)	3	2	0
4	Chris Marsden	MF	(England)	19(4)	0	2	0	2	0	23(4)	0	6	0
5	Claus Lundekvam	DF	(Norway)	38	0	4	0	2(1)	0	44(1)	0	3	0
6	Dean Richards	DF	(England)	28	1	3(1)	1	2	0	33(1)	2	1	0
7	Matt Le Tissier	MF	(England)	2(6)	1	0	0	2	1	4(6)	2	1	0
8	Matt Oakley	MF	(England)	35	1	3	0	2(1)	0	40(1)	1	1	0
9	Mark Draper	MF	(England)	16(6)	1	3(1)	0	1	0	20(7)	1	5	0
10	Kevin Davies	FW	(England)	21(6)	1	2	1	1	0	24(6)	2	9	0
11	Uwe Rösler	FW	(Germany)	6(14)	0	0(2)	0	1(1)	1	7(17)	1	3	0
13	Neil Moss	GK	(England)	3	0	0	0	0	0	3	0	0	0
15	Francis Benali	DF	(England)	0(4)	0	0	0	0	0	0(4)	0	0	0
16	James Beattie	FW	(England)	29(8)	11	4	1	2	0	35(8)	12	6	0
17	Marians Pahars	FW	(Latvia)	26(5)	9	4	0	1(1)	0	31(6)	9	1	0
18	Wayne Bridge	DF	(England)	38	0	4	0	2(1)	0	44(1)	0	1	0
19	Dani Rodrigues	MF	(Portugal)	0	0	0	0	0	0	0	0	0	0
20	Tahar El Khalej	DF	(Morocco)	25(7)	1	1(1)	0	1(2)	0	27(10)	1	7	0
21	Jo Tessem	MF	(Norway)	27(6)	4	3(1)	1	2	1	32(7)	6	1	0
24	Dan Petrescu	DF	(Romania)	8(1)	2	0	0	0	0	8(1)	2	0	0
25	Garry Monk	DF	(England)	2	0	0	0	0	0	2	0	0	0
26	Imants Bleidelis	MF	(Latvia)	0(1)	0	0(1)	0	1(1)	0	1(3)	0	0	0
27	Scott Bevan	GK	(England)	0	0	0	0	0	0	0	0	0	0
28	Kevin Gibbens	MF	(England)	1(2)	0	1	0	0	0	2(2)	0	0	0
29	Paul Hughes	MF	(England)	0	0	0	0	0	0	0	0	0	0
30	Hassan Kachloul	MF	(Morocco)	26(6)	4	2(1)	1	1	0	29(7)	5	6	1
31	Ryan Ashford	DF	(England)	0	0	0	0	1	0	1	0	0	0
33	Phil Warner	DF	(England)	0	0	0	0	0	0	0	0	0	0
Squad members who left before the end of the season
12	Richard Dryden	DF	(England)	0	0	0	0	0	0	0	0	0	0
23	Patrice Tano	FW	(Ivory Coast)	0	0	0	0	0	0	0	0	0	0
24	Patrick Colleter	DF	(France)	0	0	0	0	0	0	0	0	0	0
32	Trond Egil Soltvedt	MF	(Norway)	3(3)	1	1	0	2	2	6(3)	3	0	0
Squad members who ended the season out on loan
14	Stuart Ripley	MF	(England)	1(2)	0	0	0	1	0	2(2)	0	1	0
35	Luís Boa Morte	MF	(Portugal)	0	0	0	0	0	0	0	0	0	0

=== Most appearances ===
Rank	Name	Pos.	League		FA Cup		League Cup		Total		
Rank	Name	Pos.	Starts	Subs	Starts	Subs	Starts	Subs	Starts	Subs	Total
1	Wayne Bridge	DF	38	0	4	0	2	1	44	1	45
1	Claus Lundekvam	DF	38	0	4	0	2	1	44	1	45
3	James Beattie	FW	29	8	4	0	2	0	35	8	43
4	Paul Jones	GK	35	0	4	0	3	0	42	0	42
5	Matt Oakley	MF	35	0	3	0	2	1	40	1	41
6	Jo Tessem	MF	27	6	3	1	2	0	32	7	39
7	Jason Dodd	DF	29	2	3	0	3	0	35	2	37
7	Marians Pahars	FW	26	5	4	0	1	1	31	6	37
7	Tahar El Khalej	DF	25	7	1	1	1	2	27	10	37
10	Hassan Kachloul	MF	26	6	2	1	1	0	29	7	36

=== Top goalscorers ===
Rank	Name	Pos.	League		FA Cup		League Cup		Total		
Rank	Name	Pos.	Goals	Apps	Goals	Apps	Goals	Apps	Goals	Apps	GPG
1	James Beattie	FW	11	37	1	4	0	2	12	43	0.28
2	Marians Pahars	FW	9	31	0	4	0	2	9	37	0.24
3	Jo Tessem	MF	4	33	1	4	1	2	6	39	0.15
4	Hassan Kachloul	MF	4	32	1	3	0	1	5	36	0.14
5	Trond Egil Soltvedt	MF	1	6	0	1	2	2	3	9	0.33
5	Jason Dodd	DF	1	31	2	3	0	3	3	37	0.08
7	Dan Petrescu	DF	2	9	0	0	0	0	2	9	0.22
7	Matt Le Tissier	MF	1	8	0	0	1	2	2	10	0.20
7	Kevin Davies	FW	1	27	1	2	0	1	2	30	0.07
7	Dean Richards	DF	1	28	1	4	0	2	2	34	0.06

== Bibliography ==
- Holley, Duncan; Chalk, Gary (2003), Bull, David (ed.), In That Number: A Post-War Chronicle of Southampton FC, Bristol, England: Hagiology Publishing, ISBN 0-9534474-3-X
