= 2002–03 Southampton F.C. season =

Southampton F.C.
2002–03 season
- Chairman: Rupert Lowe
- Manager: Gordon Strachan
- Stadium: St Mary's Stadium
- Premier League: 8th
- FA Cup: Runners-up
- League Cup: Third round
- Top goalscorer: League: James Beattie (23); All: James Beattie (24)
- Highest home attendance: 32,104 (vs. Liverpool, 18 January 2003)
- Lowest home attendance: 25,714 (vs. Charlton Athletic, 21 September 2002)
- Average home league attendance: 30,680
Home colours	Away colours

The 2002–03 season was Southampton F.C.'s 11th season in the Premier League, and their 25th consecutive season in the top division of English football.

== Season summary ==
After several seasons of underachievement, Southampton recorded a final placing of 8th, at the time their highest placing in the Premier League. The club also reached the FA Cup final to face an Arsenal side which had narrowly missed out on the Premiership trophy; although Southampton lost by a single goal, as Arsenal had already qualified for the Champions League Southampton qualified for the UEFA Cup the following season.

A slow start to the season saw Southampton languishing in the relegation zone after eight matches played, but a run of eight wins and only two losses from the next fifteen matches saw Southampton rocket up the league table, peaking in fifth place. Unfortunately, the charge for European qualification through the league soon fizzled out as Southampton only won four of their last fifteen matches, dragging them down to eighth place – nonetheless, this was Southampton's highest-ever finish in the Premier League. The low point of this run was a 6–1 loss against a below-strength Arsenal side preparing for the FA Cup final. This did not bode well for the Saints, as they had also managed to reach the final, but as it transpired in the final Arsenal barely edged past Southampton, winning 1–0. Despite the disappointment of not winning the FA Cup, Southampton were rewarded with their cup run with a place in the UEFA Cup, as Arsenal had already qualified for the Champions League.

Key to Southampton's high finish was good home form – Southampton only lost two home games all season, against Manchester United and Liverpool. The good season gave Southampton hope of a more sustained charge at European qualification the next season.

== Premier League ==
Date	Opponents	H/A	Result F–A	Scorers	Attendance	League position
17 August 2002	Middlesbrough	H	0–0		28,341	9th
24 August 2002	Liverpool	A	0–3		43,058	15th
28 August 2002	Chelsea	H	1–1	Fernandes 51'	31,208	16th
31 August 2002	Tottenham Hotspur	A	1–2	Taricco 30' (o.g.)	35,573	18th
11 September 2002	Everton	H	1–0	Pahars 73' (pen.)	29,190	17th
14 September 2002	West Bromwich Albion	A	0–1		26,383	17th
21 September 2002	Charlton Athletic	H	0–0		25,714	18th
28 September 2002	Bolton Wanderers	A	1–1	Bridge 82'	22,692	18th
5 October 2002	Manchester City	H	2–0	Ormerod 2', 43'	31,009	13th
21 October 2002	Aston Villa	A	1–0	Beattie 48' (pen.)	25,817	12th
27 October 2002	Fulham	H	4–2	Beattie 27' (pen.), 42', 53', Ormerod 72'	26,188	10th
2 November 2002	Manchester United	A	1–2	Fernandes 18'	67,691	10th
9 November 2002	Blackburn Rovers	H	1–1	Beattie 38' (pen.)	30,059	10th
16 November 2002	Newcastle United	A	1–2	Beattie 2'	51,812	11th
23 November 2002	Arsenal	H	3–2	Beattie 45', 59' (pen.), Delgado 67'	31,797	9th
2 December 2002	West Ham United	A	1–0	Beattie 90'	28,844	10th
7 December 2002	Birmingham City	H	2–0	Beattie 60' (pen.), 83'	31,132	7th
14 December 2002	Newcastle United	H	1–1	Marsden 52'	32,061	7th
21 December 2002	Leeds United	A	1–1	Fernandes 89'	36,687	7th
26 December 2002	Chelsea	A	0–0		39,428	9th
28 December 2002	Sunderland	H	2–1	Beattie 73', Tessem 90'	31,423	7th
1 January 2003	Tottenham Hotspur	H	1–0	Beattie 82'	31,890	6th
11 January 2003	Middlesbrough	A	2–2	Beattie 40', 60'	27,443	5th
18 January 2003	Liverpool	H	0–1		32,104	8th
28 January 2003	Sunderland	A	1–0	Beattie 50'	34,102	6th
1 February 2003	Manchester United	H	0–2		32,085	7th
8 February 2003	Blackburn Rovers	A	0–1		24,896	9th
22 February 2003	Everton	A	1–2	Beattie 33'	36,569	10th
1 March 2003	West Bromwich Albion	H	1–0	Beattie 8'	31,915	10th
15 March 2003	Fulham	A	2–2	Beattie 81', M. Svensson 90'	18,031	9th
22 March 2003	Aston Villa	H	2–2	Beattie 40', Kevin Davies 90'	31,888	9th
5 April 2003	West Ham United	H	1–1	Beattie 44'	31,941	11th
19 April 2003	Leeds United	H	3–2	Ormerod 32', Beattie 45', A. Svensson 53'	32,032	8th
21 April 2003	Birmingham City	A	2–3	A. Svensson 26', Ormerod 77'	29,115	9th
26 April 2003	Charlton Athletic	A	1–2	Beattie 90'	25,894	10th
3 May 2003	Bolton Wanderers	H	0–0		30,951	11th
7 May 2003	Arsenal	A	1–6	Tessem 35'	38,052	11th
11 May 2003	Manchester City	A	1–0	M. Svensson 34'	34,957	8th

Round	1	2	3	4	5	6	7	8	9	10	11	12	13	14	15	16	17	18	19	20	21	22	23	24	25	26	27	28	29	30	31	32	33	34	35	36	37	38
Ground	H	A	H	A	H	A	H	A	H	A	H	A	H	A	H	A	H	H	A	A	H	H	A	H	A	H	A	A	H	A	H	H	H	A	A	H	A	A
Result	D	L	D	L	W	L	D	D	W	W	W	L	D	L	W	W	W	D	D	D	W	W	D	L	W	L	L	L	W	D	D	D	W	L	L	D	L	W
Position	9	15	16	18	17	17	18	18	13	12	10	10	10	11	9	10	7	7	7	9	7	6	5	8	6	7	9	10	10	9	9	11	8	9	10	11	11	8

Source: League matches
A = Away; H = Home; W = Win; D = Draw; L = Loss

Pos	Team	Pld	W	D	L	GF	GA	GD	Pts	Qualification or relegation
6	Blackburn Rovers	38	16	12	10	52	43	+9	60	Qualification for the UEFA Cup first round (Note: Since Liverpool qualified for the UEFA Cup via the league, their place in the UEFA Cup as League Cup winners reverted to the league and was awarded to Blackburn Rovers as the highest-placed team not already qualified for European competitions.)
7	Everton	38	17	8	13	48	49	−1	59	
8	Southampton	38	13	13	12	43	46	−3	52	Qualification for the UEFA Cup first round (Note: Since Arsenal qualified for the Champions League, their place in the UEFA Cup as FA Cup winners went to Southampton, who were the FA Cup runners-up.)
9	Manchester City	38	15	6	17	47	54	−7	51	Qualification for the UEFA Cup qualifying round (Note: Manchester City qualified as the highest-ranked team not already qualified for European competitions of Premiership Fair Play League by The Football Association, the top association among UEFA Fair Play ranking winners.)
10	Tottenham Hotspur	38	14	8	16	51	62	−11	50	

Source: Premier League
Rules for classification: 1) points; 2) goal difference; 3) number of goals scored.

== FA Cup ==
Date	Round	Opponents	H / A	Result F – A	Scorers	Attendance
4 January 2003	Round 3	Tottenham Hotspur	H	4–0	M. Svensson 13', Tessem 50', A. Svensson 56', Beattie 80'	25,589
25 January 2003	Round 4	Millwall	H	1–1	Davies 90'	23,809
5 February 2003	Round 4 Replay	Millwall	A	2–1 (a.e.t.)	Oakley 21', 102'	10,197
15 February 2003	Round 5	Norwich City	H	2–0	A. Svensson 71', Tessem 74'	31,103
9 March 2003	Round 6	Wolverhampton Wanderers	H	2–0	Marsden 56', Butler 81' (o.g.)	31,715
13 April 2003	Semi-final	Watford	N	2–1	Ormerod 43', Robinson 80' (o.g.)	42,602
17 May 2003	Final	Arsenal	N	0–1		73,726

== League Cup ==
Date	Round	Opponents	H / A	Result F – A	Scorers	Attendance
2 October 2002	Round 2	Tranmere Rovers	H	6–1	Marsden 1', Ormerod 25', 43', 68', Fernandes 52', M. Svensson 66'	16,603
6 November 2002	Round 3	Liverpool	A	1–3	Delgado 55'	35,870

== Squad statistics ==
No.	Pos.	Name	League		FA Cup		League Cup		Total		Discipline	
No.	Pos.	Name	Apps	Goals	Apps	Goals	Apps	Goals	Apps	Goals	Yellow card	Red card
1	GK	(Wales) Paul Jones	13+1	0	1+1	0	0	0	14+2	0	0	0
2	DF	(England) Jason Dodd	13+2	0	1+1	0	2	0	16+3	0	1	0
3	DF	(England) Wayne Bridge	34	1	4	0	2	0	40	1	6	0
4	MF	(England) Chris Marsden	30	1	6+1	1	2	1	38+1	3	11	0
5	DF	(Norway) Claus Lundekvam	33	0	6	0	2	0	41	0	0	0
6	DF	(England) Paul Williams	10+2	0	1	0	0	0	11+2	0	3	1
7	MF	(Russia) Andrei Kanchelskis	0+1	0	0	0	0+1	0	0+2	0	0	0
8	MF	(England) Matthew Oakley	28+3	0	7	2	2	0	40	2	2	0
9	FW	(England) James Beattie	35+3	23	7	1	2	0	44+3	24	6	0
10	FW	(England) Kevin Davies	1+8	1	0+4	1	0	0	1+12	2	0	0
11	DF	(Sweden) Michael Svensson	33+1	2	7	1	2	1	42+1	4	5	1
12	MF	(Sweden) Anders Svensson	26+7	2	6+1	2	1	0	33+8	4	3	0
13	GK	(England) Neil Moss	0	0	0	0	0	0	0	0	0	0
14	GK	(Finland) Antti Niemi	25	0	6	0	2	0	33	0	0	0
15	DF	(England) Francis Benali	2	0	2	0	0	0	4	0	1	0
16	MF	(England) Mark Draper	0	0	0	0	0	0	0	0	0	0
17	FW	(Latvia) Marian Pahars	5+4	1	0	0	0+1	0	5+5	1	2	1
18	MF	(Republic of Ireland) Rory Delap	22+2	0	3+1	0	1+1	0	26+4	0	2	0
19	DF	(England) Danny Higginbotham	3+6	0	1	0	0	0	10	0	0	0
19	DF	(England) Marcus Hall	0	0	0	0	0	0	0	0	0	0
20	MF	(England) David Prutton	9+3	0	0	0	0	0	9+3	0	2	0
20	MF	(Morocco) Tahar El Khalej	0+1	0	0	0	0	0	1	0	0	0
21	FW	(Norway) Jo Tessem	9+18	2	2+5	2	0+1	0	11+24	4	0	0
22	MF	(Argentina) Federico Arias	0	0	0	0	0	0	0	0	0	0
23	MF	(Wales) Arron Davies	0	0	0	0	0	0	0	0	0	0
25	DF	(England) Garry Monk	1	0	0	0	0	0	1	0	0	0
26	MF	(Latvia) Imants Bleidelis	0	0	0	0	0	0	0	0	0	0
27	GK	(England) Scott Bevan	0	0	0	0	0	0	0	0	0	0
28	GK	(Northern Ireland) Alan Blayney	0	0	0	0	0	0	0	0	0	0
29	MF	(France) Fabrice Fernandes	35+2	3	5+2	0	1	1	41+4	4	4	0
30	FW	(Australia) Scott McDonald	0	0	0	0	0	0	0	0	0	0
32	DF	(Northern Ireland) Chris Baird	1+2	0	1	0	0	0	4	0	1	0
33	DF	(Scotland) Paul Telfer	26+6	0	6	0	1	0	33+6	0	4	0
34	FW	(Ecuador) Agustín Delgado	2+4	1	0	0	1	1	3+4	2	0	0
35	MF	(Ecuador) Cléber Chalá	0	0	0	0	0	0	0	0	0	0
36	FW	(England) Brett Ormerod	22+9	5	5+2	1	1	3	28+11	9	4	0

== Transfers ==
=== In ===
Date	Pos.	Name	From	Fee
27 August 2002	GK	(Finland) Antti Niemi	(Scotland) Heart of Midlothian	£2m
31 August 2002	DF	(England) Marcus Hall	(England) Nottingham Forest	Free
31 August 2002	MF	(Russia) Andrei Kanchelskis	(Scotland) Rangers	Free
31 January 2003	DF	(England) Danny Higginbotham	(England) Derby County	£1.5m
31 January 2003	MF	(England) David Prutton	(England) Nottingham Forest	£2.5m
12 May 2003	DF	(England) Darren Kenton	(England) Norwich City	Free
12 May 2003	FW	(England) Dexter Blackstock	(England) Oxford United	Undisclosed

=== Out ===
Date	Pos.	Name	To	Fee
2 July 2002	FW	(Portugal) Dani Rodrigues	(England) Walsall	Free
2 July 2002	DF	(Romania) Dan Petrescu	Unattached	Released
10 December 2002	DF	(England) Marcus Hall	(England) Stoke City	Free
10 January 2003	MF	(Ecuador) Cléber Chalá	Unattached	Released
25 January 2003	MF	(Morocco) Tahar El Khalej	(England) Charlton Athletic	Released
31 January 2003	MF	(Latvia) Imants Bleidelis	(Denmark) Viborg	Free
5 February 2003	GK	(England) Neil Moss	(England) Bournemouth	Free
7 February 2003	MF	(Russia) Andrei Kanchelskis	(Saudi Arabia) Al-Hilal	Free
22 May 2003	MF	(Wales) Matt Crowell	(Wales) Wrexham	Free
31 May 2003	FW	(Australia) Scott McDonald	Unattached	Released

=== Loan in ===
Date from	Date to	Pos.	Name	Moving from
8 January 2003	23 May 2003	MF	(Argentina) Federico Arias	(Argentina) Vélez Sársfield

=== Loan out ===
Date from	Date to	Pos.	Name	Moving to
3 July 2002	29 October 2002	FW	(Australia) Scott McDonald	(England) Huddersfield Town
10 July 2002	1 June 2003	FW	(Equatorial Guinea) Jacinto Ela	(Spain) Hércules
10 July 2002	4 April 2003	GK	(England) Scott Bevan	(England) Huddersfield Town
13 September 2002	24 December 2002	GK	(England) Neil Moss	(England) Bournemouth
13 September 2002	11 November 2002	FW	(England) Kevin Davies	(England) Millwall
28 October 2002	28 January 2003	GK	(Northern Ireland) Alan Blayney	(England) Stockport County
13 December 2002	19 March 2003	DF	(England) Garry Monk	(England) Sheffield Wednesday
25 December 2002	25 January 2003	GK	(Northern Ireland) Alan Blayney	(England) Bournemouth
27 March 2003	19 August 2003	FW	(Australia) Scott McDonald	(England) Bournemouth
