= Antti Niemi (footballer) =

Finnish footballer and coach (born 1972)

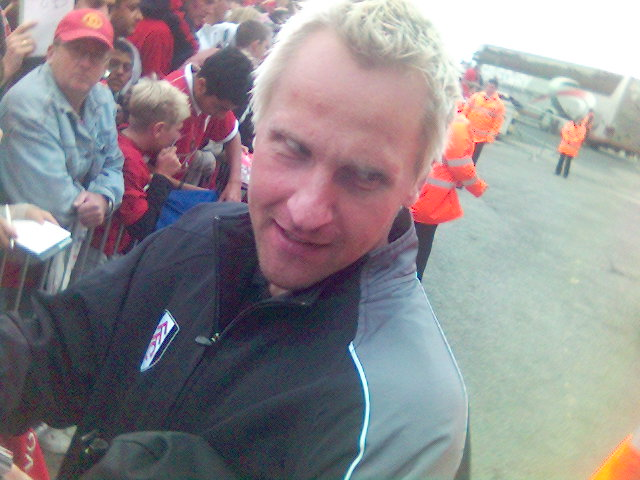
- Niemi with Fulham in 2006

Personal information
- Full name: Antti Mikko Niemi
- Date of birth: 31 May 1972 (age 54)
- Place of birth: Oulu, Finland
- Height: 1.85 m (6 ft 1 in)
- Position: Goalkeeper

Team information
- Current team: Volos (assistant); Finland (goalkeeping coach)

Senior career*
Years	Team	Apps	(Gls)
1989	OLS	15	(0)
1990	Rauman Pallo	15	(0)
1991–1995	HJK	101	(0)
1995–1997	FC Copenhagen	47	(0)
1997–1999	Rangers	13	(0)
1999	→ Charlton Athletic (loan)	0	(0)
1999–2002	Heart of Midlothian	89	(0)
2002–2006	Southampton	106	(0)
2006–2008	Fulham	62	(0)
2009–2010	Portsmouth	0	(0)
Total		418	(0)

International career
1992–2007	Finland	67	(0)

Managerial career
- 2010–: Finland (goalkeeping coach)
- 2013: HJK (goalkeeping coach)
- 2014: Honka (goalkeeping coach)
- 2014–2015: Brighton & Hove Albion (goalkeeping coach)
- 2021: HIFK (goalkeeping coach)
- 2024–: Volos (assistant)
- * Club domestic league appearances and goals

Antti Mikko Niemi (born 31 May 1972) is a Finnish former professional footballer who played as a goalkeeper. He is currently an assistant coach of Volos of the Super League Greece. Since 2010, he has also worked as the goalkeeping coach of Finland national team. He also worked as a goalkeeping coach at Brighton & Hove Albion during the 2014–15 season. Niemi spent time as a player in the Scottish Premier League (with Rangers, Heart of Midlothian) and the Premier League (with Southampton and Fulham), and in 2008 announced his retirement due to injury. However, in 2009 he returned to sign for Premier League club Portsmouth, although he did not make any appearances before leaving in 2010.

== Club career ==
=== Early career ===
Niemi was born in Oulu, Finland and started football in local club Oulun Luistinseura (OLS). In 1991, he joined HJK Helsinki, where he made over 100 appearances in four years, before transferring to FC Copenhagen in 1995. Impressive performances over the next two years saw a transfer to Scotland with Glasgow club Rangers.

=== Rangers ===
Niemi joined Rangers in 1997 and initially competed with Andy Goram and Theo Snelders for the goalkeeper position; he made seven appearances in all competitions in his first season at Rangers. The following season, 1998−99, Niemi began the season competing with Lionel Charbonnier to be Rangers' goalkeeper. Niemi started the 1998 Scottish League Cup final as Rangers defeated St Johnstone, however Stefan Klos was signed in December 1998 and immediately became Rangers' first choice. Rangers won the Scottish Premier League in the 1998–99 season, but Niemi only contributed seven league appearances. In fact, Niemi only made one Rangers appearance after Klos was signed, which came in the league against Motherwell in August 1999. Niemi also had a brief loan spell at Charlton Athletic late in 1999.

=== Hearts ===
Niemi moved to Edinburgh to join Heart of Midlothian in December 1999. He became a hero for Hearts fans in the three years he played at Tynecastle. Niemi also became famous in Scotland for his ability to save penalties, demonstrating this skill when saving from Dundee United's Charlie Miller and Dunfermline Athletic's Scott Thomson. Niemi also played in European competition for Hearts against opponents such as Stuttgart.

In a more light-hearted incident, Niemi was also famously during his time at Hearts the subject of a call during a phone-in on radio channel Talksport, in which a Scottish fan queried why Niemi had not been called up to the Scotland national team. When presenter Arthur Albiston told the caller that Niemi was in fact Finnish, the caller replied "He's no' finish', he's only 28!"

Upon his retirement, Niemi recalled his time at Hearts, quoting: "it was all good. Looking back, everything went so well – it was a lovely club, the team was doing well, I was playing well and we had a good manager in Jim Jefferies".

=== Southampton ===
After three seasons in Edinburgh, Niemi moved to Southampton in 2002 for a fee of £2 million. He played for Southampton in the 2003 FA Cup final against Arsenal, which the Saints lost 1–0; Niemi became the first goalkeeper to be substituted in an FA Cup Final when he was replaced by Paul Jones during the game due to a calf injury. In a game against Fulham in the 2002–03 season, he came up for a corner in injury time with Southampton trailing 2–1. The ball fell at his feet and he crashed a shot against the crossbar, and Michael Svensson was able to turn in the rebound, salvaging a draw. In March 2004 he saved a Michael Owen penalty to help his team to a 2–0 win over Liverpool. There was much speculation regarding Niemi's future at Southampton with a host of leading Premier League clubs rumoured to be interested in his services, such as Manchester United and Arsenal. After Southampton were relegated in 2005 and failed to challenge for promotion in the following season, Niemi decided to return to the Premiership with Fulham, for whom he signed in January 2006. Niemi would describe being relegated as a "first bad experience in British football".

=== Fulham ===
Niemi signed with Fulham for a fee of around £1 million in January 2006. Niemi was badly hurt in a freak accident during a match against Watford on 1 January 2007 when rushing out to head the ball; he toppled over his own defender, Carlos Bocanegra, and landed on his head. He was taken from the field of play on a stretcher after ten minutes of treatment, but was later cleared of any spinal injury. He was released from hospital later that night with only ligament and muscle damage to the neck.

He remained Fulham's first choice keeper until 1 March 2008, when, following injury, he was replaced by Kasey Keller. On 3 September 2008, it was announced that he had retired from professional football due to a wrist injury.

=== Portsmouth ===
Despite announcing his retirement from the game the previous year it was confirmed on 28 July 2009 that Antti Niemi was in talks with Portsmouth. On 7 August, Niemi confirmed he had signed for Portsmouth on a one-year deal as backup to David James and to work with the goalkeeping coaches. On 24 March 2010, he was released from his contract, without making a single appearance for Portsmouth's first team. It was reported that Niemi earned almost £450,000 during those eight months with Portsmouth.

== International career ==
Niemi was first choice for the Finland national team for almost a decade, before announcing his decision to retire from international football in 2005, but returned to the squad in 2007 playing a friendly game against Spain (0–0). He was capped 67 times by his country before this. On 2 March 2010, Niemi joined Finland's national team as a goalkeeping coach.

== Coaching career ==
Niemi began his coaching career as the goalkeeping coach for the Finland national team in March 2010. On 3 January 2013, his first club and reigning Veikkausliiga champions HJK announced that they had appointed Niemi as the club's goalkeeping coach and that he would continue his duties with the national team.

After a brief stint in FC Honka coaching staff, on 27 June 2014, Niemi was appointed goalkeeper coach at Championship side Brighton & Hove Albion by former Finland teammate Sami Hyypiä. Hyypia resigned in December 2014, and Niemi left his role in May 2015, returning to Finland for "personal reasons".

On 26 January 2021, Niemi was appointed in the coaching staff of HIFK, after a request of then head coach Joaquín Gómez.

== Career statistics ==
=== Club ===
As of 7 March 2024

Club	Season	League			National cup (Note: Includes Finnish Cup, Danish Cup, Scottish Cup, FA Cup)		League cup (Note: Includes Scottish League Cup, Football League Cup)		Continental		Total	
Club	Season	Division	Apps	Goals	Apps	Goals	Apps	Goals	Apps	Goals	Apps	Goals
OLS	1989	Kakkonen	15	0	0	0	—		—		15	0
Rauman Pallo	1990	Kakkonen	15	0	0	0	—		—		15	0
HJK	1991	Veikkausliiga	2	0	0	0	—		—		2	0
HJK	1992	Veikkausliiga	27	0	0	0	—		—		27	0
HJK	1993	Veikkausliiga	24	0	0	0	—		3 (Note: Appearances in UEFA Champions League)	0	27	0
HJK	1994	Veikkausliiga	24	0	0	0	—		3 (Note: Appearances in UEFA Cup Winners' Cup)	0	27	0
HJK	1995	Veikkausliiga	24	0	0	0	—		2 (Note: Appearances in UEFA Intertoto Cup)	0	26	0
HJK	Total		101	0	0	0	0	0	8	0	109	0
FC Copenhagen	1995–96	Danish Superliga	17	0	0	0	—		—		17	0
FC Copenhagen	1996–97	Danish Superliga	30	0	0	0	—		4	0	34	0
FC Copenhagen	Total		47	0	0	0	0	0	4	0	51	0
Rangers	1997–98	Scottish Premier Division	5	0	0	0	0	0	2	0	7	0
Rangers	1998–99	Scottish Premier League	7	0	0	0	1	0	6 (Note: Appearances in UEFA Cup)	0	14	0
Rangers	1999–2000	Scottish Premier League	1	0	0	0	0	0	0	0	1	0
Rangers	Total		13	0	0	0	1	0	8	0	22	0
Charlton Athletic (loan)	1999–2000	First Division	0	0	0	0	–		0	0	0	0
Hearts	1999–2000	Scottish Premier League	17	0	3	0	1	0	–		21	0
Hearts	2000–01	Scottish Premier League	37	0	5	0	2	0	4	0	48	0
Hearts	2001–02	Scottish Premier League	32	0	1	0	1	0	–		34	0
Hearts	2002–03	Scottish Premier League	3	0	–		–		–		3	0
Hearts	Total		89	0	9	0	4	0	4	0	106	0
Southampton	2002–03	Premier League	25	0	6	0	2	0	–		33	0
Southampton	2003–04	Premier League	28	0	1	0	3	0	1	0	33	0
Southampton	2004–05	Premier League	28	0	2	0	2	0	–		32	0
Southampton	2005–06	Championship	25	0	0	0	0	0	–		25	0
Southampton	Total		106	0	9	0	7	0	1	0	123	0
Fulham	2005–06	Premier League	9	0	–		–		–		9	0
Fulham	2006–07	Premier League	31	0	0	0	0	0	–		31	0
Fulham	2007–08	Premier League	22	0	1	0	0	0	–		23	0
Fulham	Total		62	0	1	0	0	0	0	0	63	0
Portsmouth	2009–10	Premier League	0	0	0	0	0	0	–		0	0
Career total			448	0	19	0	12	0	25	0	504	0

== Honours ==
Southampton

- FA Cup runner-up: 2002–03
