= Wayne Bridge =

English footballer (born 1980)

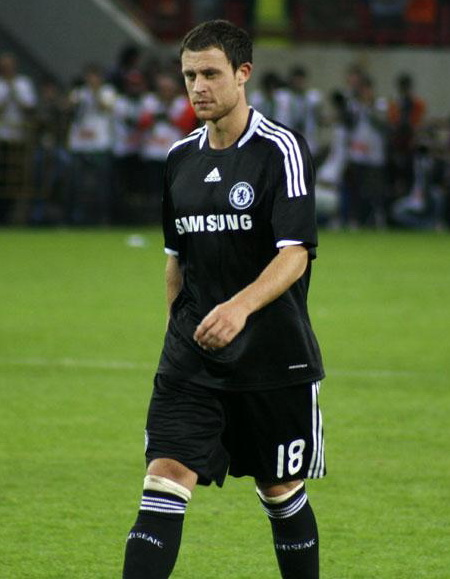
- Bridge with Chelsea in 2008

Personal information
- Full name: Wayne Michael Bridge
- Date of birth: 5 August 1980 (age 46)
- Place of birth: Southampton, England
- Height: 1.78 m (5 ft 10 in)
- Position: Left back

Youth career
- Olivers Battery
- 1996–1998: Southampton

Senior career*
Years	Team	Apps	(Gls)
1998–2003	Southampton	151	(2)
2003–2009	Chelsea	87	(1)
2006	→ Fulham (loan)	12	(0)
2009–2013	Manchester City	42	(0)
2011	→ West Ham United (loan)	15	(0)
2012	→ Sunderland (loan)	8	(0)
2012–2013	→ Brighton & Hove Albion (loan)	37	(3)
2013–2014	Reading	12	(0)
Total		364	(6)

International career
1998–1999	England U18	3	(0)
1999–2001	England U21	8	(0)
2002–2009	England	36	(1)
- * Club domestic league appearances and goals

Wayne Michael Bridge (born 5 August 1980) is an English former professional footballer who played as a left back.

A graduate of the Southampton academy, he made his debut in 1998 and would go on to make over 150 league appearances in Premier League before going on to have an extensive career with Chelsea where he won all three domestic competitions over the course of his six-year stay at Stamford Bridge. He also spent time on loan with Fulham before later in 2009 joining Manchester City, where he remained for four seasons, although his final two were spent on loan with West Ham and Sunderland as well as a spell in the EFL Championship with Brighton & Hove Albion. He retired in 2014 following a season with Reading.

Bridge made 36 appearances for the England national team between 2002 and 2009, being selected for two FIFA World Cup squads and UEFA Euro 2004.

== Club career ==
=== Southampton ===
Bridge was born in Southampton, but moved to Stanmore, Winchester at an early age. He attended Oliver's Battery Primary and Kings' School, Winchester. When playing for Olivers Battery F.C. he was spotted by Micky Adams, who recommended him to Southampton, who signed him as a trainee in July 1996. He made his reserve team debut as a centre-forward against Portsmouth on 13 August 1997 and turned professional in January 1998.

Bridge made his first-team debut on 16 August 1998 (the opening day of the 1998–99 season) coming on as a replacement for John Beresford, who had badly damaged his knee. Bridge made his first senior start in the next match on 22 August in a 5–0 defeat away to Charlton Athletic. As Southampton struggled to pick up points (with only two points after the first nine games), Bridge played (on the left wing) in most of Saints' league games until early December before losing his place to Hassan Kachloul. For the remainder of the 1998–99 Premier League season, Bridge was only used occasionally as Saints narrowly avoided relegation. He completed his first season as a first-team player with 15 starts and eight substitute appearances.

The following season carried on in a similar vein with Bridge making occasional appearances on the left wing until injuries to Francis Benali and the poor form of his intended replacement Patrick Colleter gave Bridge the opportunity to play at left-back, where he soon became a fixture in the Saints starting line-up. In the 1999–2000 season, he made 15 starts (plus four substitute appearances) scoring his first senior goal, with a powerful free-kick over the wall, in the final match of the season on 14 May 2000 against Wimbledon, as a result of which Wimbledon were relegated to Division 1 after 14 years in the top flight.

In the 2000–01 season, Bridge was an ever-present at left-back as Saints finished their final season at The Dell in tenth place in the Premier League table. Bridge was rewarded by being voted the Southampton Player of the Year for the 2000–01 season.

Bridge was "fast, determined, skilful and full of youthful promise" and "his forward runs became an exciting sight at The Dell and then at St Mary's." He was an ever-present yet again in the following season as Saints again finished their first season at their new stadium comfortably in mid-table.

Bridge's temperament and consistency, together with a high level of fitness, enabled him to continue to play every match until 18 January 2003 when he limped off with an injury in a 1–0 defeat to Liverpool. This brought to an end a run of 113 consecutive appearances, a Premier League record for an outfield player (since surpassed by Frank Lampard). His run started on 4 March 2000, from when Bridge played 10,160 consecutive minutes of Premier League football, not missing any play through injury or suspension.

By now, bigger clubs were trailing Bridge, and he was finally tempted away to join Chelsea for £7 million in the 2003 close season. His last appearance for the club came in the 2003 FA Cup Final defeat to Arsenal. During his five years as a Saints first-team player, he made 173 appearances, with two league goals against Wimbledon and Bolton Wanderers.

=== Chelsea ===
After five years with the Saints, Bridge moved to Chelsea in July 2003 for a fee of £7 million plus Graeme Le Saux, and was initially a regular starter. His finest moment came in the Champions League quarter-final against Arsenal in 2003–04. Bridge scored the winning goal in the 88th minute to send Chelsea into the semi-finals and end an 18-game winless run against Arsenal. The goal was later voted goal of the season. Bridge also scored against Beşiktaş and Portsmouth in the 2003–04 season.

Bridge started the 2004–05 season playing regularly under new manager José Mourinho, but he picked up a serious ankle injury in an FA Cup tie against Newcastle United on 20 February 2005. This ended his season and also meant he missed the following weekend's League Cup Final. Chelsea went on to win the Premier League in his absence but Bridge had already made enough appearances (15) to receive a winners' medal.

For the 2005–06 season, Chelsea signed Spanish left-back Asier del Horno and Bridge faced a challenge to get back into the side when he recovered from the injury that kept him out of the team in the latter stages of the 2004–05 campaign. He only made two appearances for Chelsea that season, both in domestic cup games. These limited first team opportunities saw him join Fulham on loan on 19 January 2006. He made his debut in a 2–1 defeat to West Ham United at Upton Park. The move seemed to benefit him as he managed to secure his place in the 2006 World Cup English squad for the tournament in Germany. Chelsea won the Premier League again, but Bridge was not eligible for a medal this time as he had not made a single league appearance for them all season.

Bridge's main competition for the Chelsea left back position then came from fellow England international left back Ashley Cole. Bridge played the full match in Chelsea's 3–0 victory over Manchester City on the opening day of the 2006–07 Premier League season, providing a telling cross for the third goal, scored by a header from Didier Drogba. His strong early season form, however, was not enough to hold down the left-back position, with Mourinho preferring Ashley Cole in most games. Following Cole's injury in the 3–0 Premier League win against Blackburn Rovers early in 2007, Bridge became Chelsea's natural choice for left-back.

Bridge featured in attack for an injury struck Chelsea side against League Two side Wycombe Wanderers in the 2007 semi-final 1st leg League Cup match, scoring one goal in the process.

Bridge finished the 2006–07 season with two cup final winner's medals after playing in both the League Cup Final against Arsenal in a 2–1 win and in the FA Cup Final against Manchester United in a 1–0 victory.

Bridge played his third cup final for Chelsea in just over two years in the 2–1 loss in the 2008 League Cup Final against Tottenham Hotspur. Bridge was adjudged to have handled the ball in the penalty area and Tottenham were awarded a penalty from which they scored, going on to win 2–1 after extra-time.

In the League Cup fourth round tie against Burnley in the 2008–09 season, Bridge wore the captain's armband in the absence of John Terry and Frank Lampard, but the Blues lost on penalties.

=== Manchester City ===
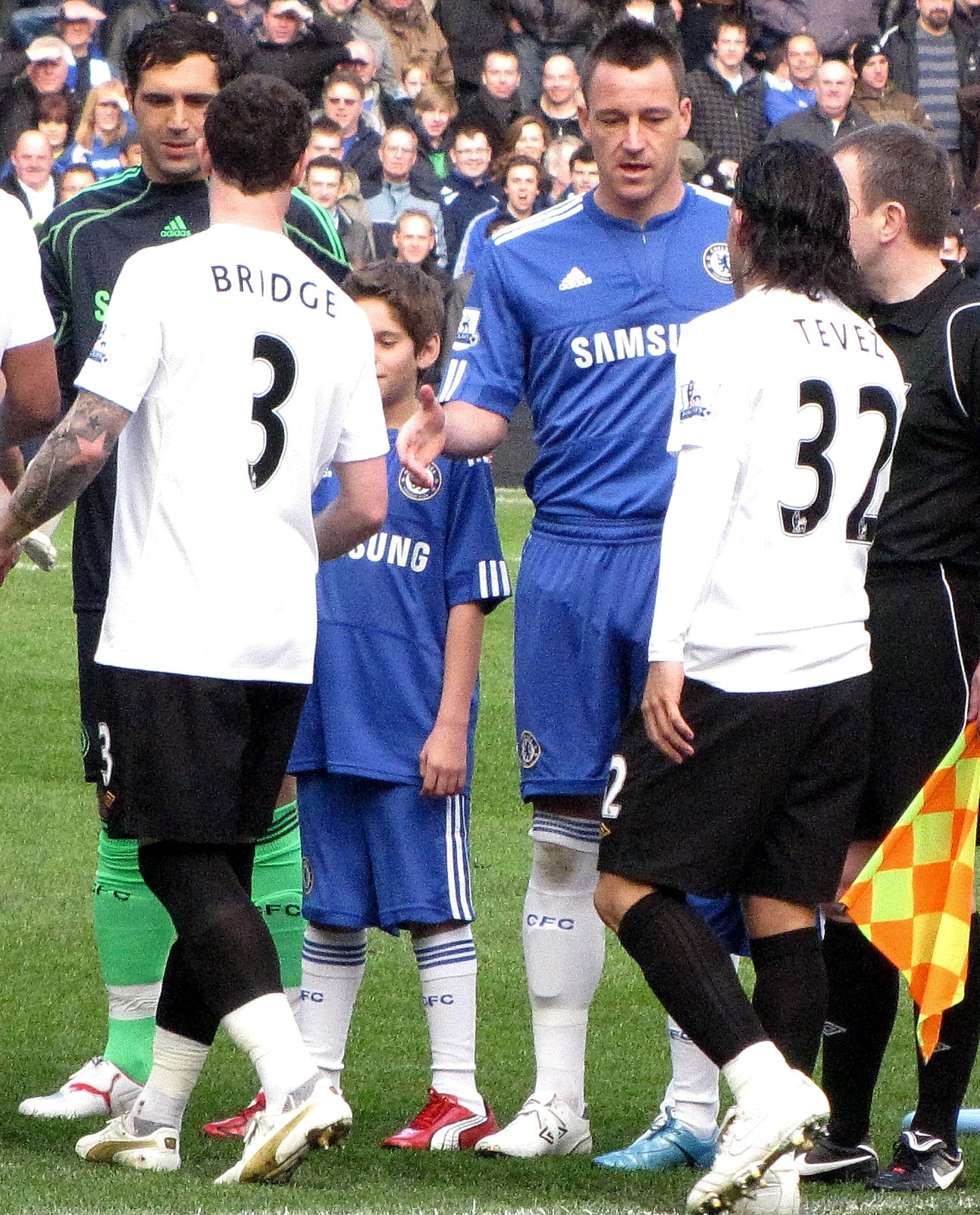
Bridge refuses to shake John Terry's hand at the start of Manchester City's game against Chelsea on 27 February 2010.

On 2 January 2009, it was confirmed by Mark Hughes that Manchester City had agreed an undisclosed fee with Chelsea for Bridge, thought to be around £10 million and, on the following day, Manchester City agreed personal terms with the player, who later passed his medical, thus enabling the transfer to be completed and he signed a four-and-a-half-year deal. Bridge was unveiled to the home fans that day at an FA Cup home tie against Nottingham Forest, and two weeks later made his debut for the club in a 1–0 win against Wigan Athletic in the league. He was given the squad number 25. For the 2009–10 season, Bridge switched to the number 3, which was previously worn by Michael Ball.

On 27 February 2010, City inflicted Chelsea's first home Premier League defeat of the season with a 4–2 victory. Prior to the match, Bridge was involved in a highly publicised incident in which he refused to shake hands with Chelsea captain and former club and international teammate John Terry, who was at the time the subject of claims that he had had an affair with Bridge's ex-girlfriend Vanessa Perroncel.

His position as left-back for Manchester City gradually faded with the arrival of two new left-backs. In the summer of 2010, Manchester City manager Roberto Mancini signed Aleksandar Kolarov from Lazio, and in 2011 signed Gaël Clichy from Arsenal, thus indicating Bridge was surplus to requirements at City. On 12 January 2011, Bridge joined West Ham United on loan until the end of the season. He made his West Ham debut on 15 January 2011 in a 3–0 loss to Arsenal. Bridge made 18 appearances in all competitions for West Ham before his loan ended.

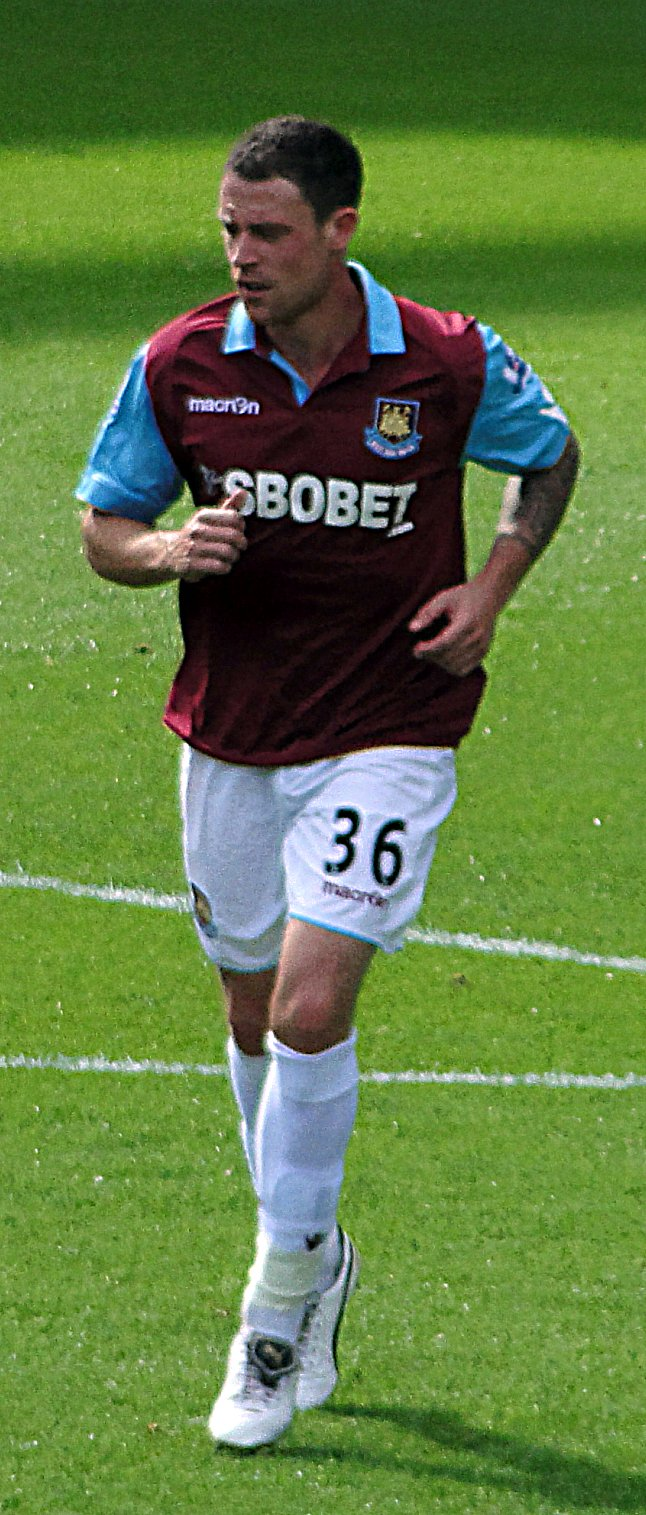
Bridge playing for West Ham United.

On 31 January 2012, it was announced that Bridge had joined Sunderland on a loan deal until the end of the 2011–12 season. He made his debut appearance as an 82nd minute substitute for Kieran Richardson in Sunderland's 3–0 victory over Norwich City the following day. He made his first start for Sunderland in their 1–0 win over Liverpool on 10 March 2012, and also featured in the FA Cup quarter-final draw with Everton the following week.

On 6 July 2012, it was confirmed that Bridge would join Brighton & Hove Albion on a season-long loan. He made his debut for Brighton on 14 August 2012 in a 3–0 away defeat to Swindon Town in the League Cup. His first Brighton goal came on 25 August 2012 in a 5–1 home victory over Barnsley, his first league goal since scoring for Chelsea in December 2003. Bridge played 37 league games for Brighton, scoring three goals and helping them reach fourth place in the league to qualify for the play-offs. He played in both semi-final games against Crystal Palace where Brighton were beaten 2–0 on aggregate. At the end of the season, Bridge thanked Brighton manager Gus Poyet for revitalising his footballing career. He told The Independent, "Brighton have been great to me. I just want to say a big thank you to the chairman and the fans. Gus has revitalised my love for football after I was in the wilderness at Manchester City."

=== Reading and retirement ===
In June 2013, Bridge signed a one-year contract with Reading, who had just been relegated to the Football League Championship. Bridge chose Reading ahead of offers from Queens Park Rangers and Brighton, who wished to make his loan permanent.

On 6 May 2014, Bridge was released by Reading after 12 games in his only season for the club, subsequently retiring from professional football.

== International career ==
During his time with Southampton, all Bridge's managers (Jones, Hoddle and Gray) predicted full international honours. He was soon making regular appearances for the England under-21 team, and the managers' prophecy was realised when Sven-Göran Eriksson gave him his first full cap against the Netherlands on 13 February 2002. He quickly proved himself and appeared twice as a substitute in the 2002 World Cup, although he did not appear at all in Euro 2004, with Ashley Cole being preferred.

During qualification for the 2006 World Cup, Bridge occupied England's problematic left midfield position, but lost this to his Chelsea teammate Joe Cole when he received an injury. He returned to the England team for a friendly against Argentina in November 2005, covering for the injured Cole at left back and winning his 21st cap.

Bridge played in the Euro 2008 qualifier match against Estonia on 6 June 2007, which England won 3–0, with Bridge assisting Joe Cole's goal with a long throw into the box.

Bridge's final appearance for England was against Brazil on 14 November 2009. On 25 February 2010, Bridge announced his permanent withdrawal from international duty following allegations regarding England captain John Terry and Bridge's former girlfriend Vanessa Perroncel.

== Boxing ==
On 23 March 2018, Bridge took part in an exhibition boxing match against English television personality Spencer Matthews as part of BBC's Sport Relief programme. Bridge defeated Matthews via unanimous decision after three rounds.

On 18 January 2025, it was reported that Bridge was being lined up to face English internet personality KSI on 29 March in a professional boxing match. Later that night during the broadcast of MF & DAZN: X Series 20, KSI came into the ring and revealed his original opponent scheduled for March withdrew, thus leading into a face-off with Bridge. The pair got into a brawl after KSI pushed Bridge and brought up John Terry and Bridge's former girlfriend Vanessa Perroncel. Two days later Bridge withdrew from the bout due to the comments made by KSI.

== Personal life ==
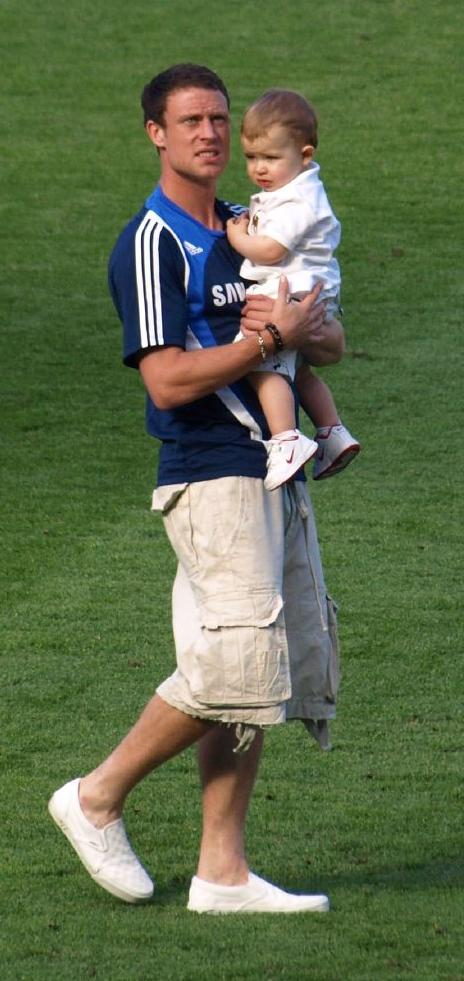
Bridge with his son Jaydon in 2008

Bridge was in a relationship with French model Vanessa Perroncel from 2005 to 2009. They had a son together, Jaydon Jean Claude Bridge, who was born on 21 November 2006. The next day, Bridge signed a new four-year contract with Chelsea.

In January 2010, a super injunction was imposed by a High Court judge preventing the media reporting that Bridge's former teammate John Terry had allegedly had an affair with Perroncel shortly after she split from Bridge. The injunction was lifted a week later. On 25 March, Perroncel succeeded in a claim against Bridge for maintenance for their son with the High Court awarding her a payment of £6,000 per month until Jaydon's 18th birthday. The News of the World printed an apology for the story on 3 October 2010 to Perroncel for invading her private life, and indicating that she has refuted the claims against herself and Terry.

On 8 April 2013, the Saturdays singer Frankie Sandford announced on Twitter that she was engaged to Bridge. She gave birth to their son, Parker Bridge, on 18 October 2013. The couple married on 19 July 2014 in a private ceremony. In January 2015, Sandford announced that they were expecting their second child. On 15 August 2015, Carter Bridge was born.

Bridge was a contestant in the 2016 series of television series I'm a Celebrity...Get Me Out of Here!, but was voted out on 2 December. In 2019, he won the first celebrity series of Channel 4's SAS: Who Dares Wins, after trekking the El Morado glacier in Chile.

Bridge has spoken about his love for playing poker, which began when his friends started a local monthly home game. He plays in one day live events, and has described his style of play as 'kamikaze'.

== Career statistics ==
=== Club ===
Appearances and goals by club, season and competition
Club	Season	League			FA Cup		League Cup		Other		Total	
Club	Season	Division	Apps	Goals	Apps	Goals	Apps	Goals	Apps	Goals	Apps	Goals
Southampton	1998–99	Premier League	23	0	0	0	1	0	—		24	0
Southampton	1999–2000	Premier League	18	1	2	0	2	0	—		22	1
Southampton	2000–01	Premier League	38	0	4	0	3	0	—		45	0
Southampton	2001–02	Premier League	38	0	1	0	3	0	—		42	0
Southampton	2002–03	Premier League	34	1	4	0	2	0	—		40	1
Southampton	Total		151	2	11	0	11	0	—		173	2
Chelsea	2003–04	Premier League	33	1	2	0	0	0	13 (Note: Appearances in the UEFA Champions League)	2	48	3
Chelsea	2004–05	Premier League	15	0	2	0	4	0	4	0	25	0
Chelsea	2005–06	Premier League	0	0	1	0	1	0	0	0	2	0
Chelsea	2006–07	Premier League	22	0	3	0	4	1	4 (Note: One appearance in the FA Community Shield, three appearances in the UEFA Champions League)	0	33	1
Chelsea	2007–08	Premier League	11	0	3	0	5	0	3	0	22	0
Chelsea	2008–09	Premier League	6	0	0	0	2	0	4	0	12	0
Chelsea	Total		87	1	11	0	16	1	28	2	142	4
Fulham (loan)	2005–06	Premier League	12	0	—		—		—		12	0
Manchester City	2008–09	Premier League	16	0	—		—		6 (Note: Appearances in the UEFA Cup)	0	22	0
Manchester City	2009–10	Premier League	23	0	2	0	3	0	—		28	0
Manchester City	2010–11	Premier League	3	0	0	0	0	0	4 (Note: Appearances in the UEFA Europa League)	0	7	0
Manchester City	2011–12	Premier League	0	0	0	0	1	0	0	0	1	0
Manchester City	Total		42	0	2	0	4	0	10	0	58	0
West Ham United (loan)	2010–11	Premier League	15	0	2	0	1	0	—		18	0
Sunderland (loan)	2011–12	Premier League	8	0	2	0	—		—		10	0
Brighton & Hove Albion (loan)	2012–13	Championship	37	3	2	0	1	0	2 (Note: Appearances in the Championship play-offs)	0	42	3
Reading	2013–14	Championship	12	0	0	0	0	0	—		12	0
Career total			364	6	30	0	33	1	40	2	467	9

=== International ===
Appearances and goals by national team and year
National team	Year	Apps	Goals
England	2002	9	0
England	2003	6	0
England	2004	5	1
England	2005	1	0
England	2006	3	0
England	2007	3	0
England	2008	5	0
England	2009	4	0
Total		36	1

Scores and results list England's goal tally first, score column indicates score after each Bridge goal.

List of international goals scored by Wayne Bridge
No.	Date	Venue	Cap	Opponent	Score	Result	Competition
1	5 June 2004	City of Manchester Stadium, Manchester, England	17	Iceland	5–1	6–1	2004 FA Summer Tournament

== Honours ==
Southampton

- FA Cup runner-up: 2002–03

Chelsea

- Premier League: 2004–05
- FA Cup: 2006–07
- Football League Cup: 2006–07; runner-up: 2007–08

Individual

- PFA Team of the Year: 2001–02 Premier League, 2012–13 Championship
