= Patrice Tano =

Ivorian footballer (born 1982)

Personal information
- Date of birth: 22 September 1982 (age 44)
- Place of birth: Ouragahio, Ivory Coast
- Height: 5 ft 7 in (1.70 m)
- Position: Striker

Youth career
- 1997–1999: Monaco
- 1999–2000: Southampton
- 2000: Beveren

Senior career*
| Years | Team | Apps | (Gls) |
| 2000–2001 | Mechelen | 1 | (0) |
| 2001–2002 | Telstar | 0 | (0) |
| 2002 | Colchester United | 0 | (0) |
| 2002 | Falkirk | 6 | (0) |
- * Club domestic league appearances and goals

Patrice Tano (born 22 September 1982) is a former professional footballer who played as a striker.

Tano began his career at Monaco, before moving to English club Southampton in 2000. He later moved to Belgian side Mechelen, and then Dutch club Telstar. He had a trial with English side Colchester United in 2002 prior to signing a non-contract agreement, and then had a similar arrangement with Scottish club Falkirk.

== Career ==
Born in Ivory Coast and a French passport holder, Tano began his career with Monaco. He joined Premier League side Southampton in July 2000 after he was recommended to the club by Hassan Kachloul, while Tano was advised by former Monaco teammate Thierry Henry. He signed a four-year deal with the Saints.

Tano left Southampton after just four months in England, moving to Belgian side Mechelen in November 2000. He then moved to the Netherlands to play for Telstar in July 2001. In February 2002, he joined English Second Division club Colchester United, initially on trial. However, he left the club in early March failing to make an appearance.

In March 2002, Tano joined up with Scottish First Division side Falkirk, initially on trial. He made his debut for Falkirk in their 2–2 draw against Airdrieonians on 23 March as a substitute. He made six appearances in total for Falkirk without scoring.
