= 2003 FA Cup final =

English football match

- The match programme cover
- Event: 2002–03 FA Cup
Arsenal	Southampton
1	0
- Date: 17 May 2003
- Venue: Millennium Stadium, Cardiff
- Man of the Match: Thierry Henry (Arsenal)
- Referee: Graham Barber (Hertfordshire)
- Attendance: 73,726
- Weather: Rainy; 13 °C (55 °F)

The 2003 FA Cup final was the 122nd final of the FA Cup, the world's oldest domestic football cup competition. The final took place on Saturday 17 May 2003 at the Millennium Stadium in Cardiff, in front of a crowd of 73,726. It was the third consecutive year the final was played at the stadium, due to the ongoing reconstruction of Wembley Stadium, the final's usual venue. The 2003 final was the first to be played indoors; the roof was closed because of bad weather. The clubs contesting the final were Arsenal, the holders of the competition and Southampton. This was Arsenal's sixteenth appearance in a final to Southampton's fourth.

As Premier League clubs, Arsenal and Southampton entered the FA Cup in the third round, which meant each club needed to progress through five rounds to reach the final. Arsenal made a convincing start, they won their opening three rounds, but needed a sixth-round replay against Chelsea. By contrast, Southampton played one replay in the fourth round against Millwall. Arsenal entered the match as favourites and had beaten Southampton 6–1 nine days earlier in the league. Goalkeeper David Seaman captained Arsenal in the absence of the injured Patrick Vieira; it was to be Seaman's last appearance for the club. In defence for Southampton, Chris Baird made only his second competitive start. Chris Marsden captained the club in the absence of the injured club captain, Jason Dodd.

Arsenal began the match more effectively of the two and scored what proved to be the winning goal in the latter minutes of the first half – Freddie Ljungberg's rebounded goal effort was converted by Robert Pires. Midway through the second half, Southampton goalkeeper Antti Niemi was substituted, as he strained his calf muscle; he was replaced by Paul Jones. In stoppage time, striker James Beattie had his header cleared off the line by Ashley Cole, in what was the final chance for Southampton.

Arsenal's win made them the first team to retain the trophy since Tottenham Hotspur in 1982. They later played against league champions Manchester United in the 2003 FA Community Shield. Given Arsenal had already qualified for Europe via their league position, their UEFA Cup spot was awarded to runners-up Southampton.

== Route to the final ==
=== Arsenal ===
Round	Opposition	Score
3rd	Oxford United (h)	2–0
4th	Farnborough Town (a)	5–1
5th	Manchester United (a)	2–0
6th	Chelsea (h)	2–2
6th	Chelsea (a)	3–1
Semi-final	Sheffield United (n)	1–0
Key: (h) = Home venue; (a) = Away venue; (n) = Neutral venue.

Arsenal entered the competition in the third round, receiving a bye as a Premier League club. Their opening match was a 2–0 home win against Oxford United on 4 January 2003. Striker Dennis Bergkamp scored his 100th goal for the club and an own goal by defender Scott McNiven ensured progression to the next round. Arsenal faced non-league side Farnborough Town; the match switched from Farnborough's ground at Cherrywood Road to Highbury due to concerns over safety. Farnborough began the match as the home team and conceded the first goal, scored by Arsenal defender Sol Campbell in the 19th minute. They went down to ten men after Christian Lee was sent off for a professional foul in the 28th minute. Francis Jeffers scored twice before Rocky Baptiste added a consolation, beating Pascal Cygan for pace and despite having his first shot saved by goalkeeper Stuart Taylor, he managed to lift the ball over him and into the net. Lauren and Bergkamp each scored in the final 15 minutes to give Arsenal a 5–1 victory.

Arsenal's fifth round match was away to league rivals Manchester United at Old Trafford on 16 February 2003. After Ryan Giggs missed the chance to score past an open goal, midfielder Edu gave Arsenal the lead through a free kick which took a deflection off David Beckham's shoulder. Striker Sylvain Wiltord scored the second goal of the match in the 52nd minute, running onto a pass from Edu and side-footing the ball past goalkeeper Fabien Barthez. Arsenal captain Patrick Vieira said of the performance: "We knew when we lost here in the league that we had lost the battle in midfield. We had to put that right, and we did." In the sixth round, Arsenal was drawn at home to Chelsea in a repeat of the previous season's final. Chelsea defender John Terry put Chelsea ahead with a header from a set piece before Arsenal responded through Jeffers and Thierry Henry. Frank Lampard scored a late equaliser for the visiting team meaning the match was replayed at Stamford Bridge. An own goal by Terry and a strike by Wiltord in the space of seven minutes during the replay gave Arsenal an early lead against Chelsea. Despite going down to ten men after Cygan was sent off and Terry scoring from a header, the away team scored a third goal through Lauren to ensure progression into the semi-finals. In the semi-final against Sheffield United on 13 April 2003 at Old Trafford, Freddie Ljungberg scored the winning goal to help Arsenal reach their third successive FA Cup final appearance. The match was best remembered for David Seaman's late save, which prevented Sheffield United from equalising.

=== Southampton ===
Round	Opposition	Score
3rd	Tottenham Hotspur (h)	4–0
4th	Millwall (h)	1–1
4th	Millwall (a)	2–1
5th	Norwich City (h)	2–0
6th	Wolverhampton Wanderers (h)	2–0
Semi-final	Watford (n)	2–1
Key: (h) = Home venue; (a) = Away venue; (n) = Neutral venue.

Like Arsenal, as a Premier League club, Southampton received a bye into the third round. Their opening match was a 4–0 win against fellow league club Tottenham Hotspur. A goal by defender Michael Svensson and three from Jo Tessem, Anders Svensson and James Beattie in the second half was the second straight victory against Tottenham, having beaten them on New Year's Day in the league. In the fourth round, Southampton was drawn at home to First Division club Millwall on 25 January 2003. The visitors took the lead through striker Steve Claridge but were denied victory. 90 seconds from the end of the match as Southampton striker Kevin Davies scored from a rebounded shot. In the replay, midfielder Matthew Oakley scored twice for Southampton (one in both halves) either side of a Steven Reid equaliser for Millwall.

Southampton's fifth round match was against Norwich City at home on 5 February 2003. Two goals in the space of three minutes, scored by Anders Svensson and Jo Tessem was enough to take the team into the quarter-finals. Southampton defender Claus Lundekvam was pleased with the win and said following the match: "When you get to this stage in the competition you have to believe you can win it." The club then faced Wolverhampton Wanderers at home in the following round. Former Wolves player Chris Marsden gave Southampton the lead right in the 56th minute and with nine minutes remaining of normal time, the team added a second goal when Jo Tessem's shot took a deflection off Paul Butler's legs to go inside the goal net. The victory meant Southampton reached the semi-finals of the FA Cup for the first time in 17 years. At Villa Park, Southampton played First Division team Watford on 13 April 2003. Brett Ormerod opened the scoring two minutes before half time and set up the second goal which saw the ball being taken over the line by Watford defender Paul Robinson. Despite Marcus Gayle scoring a late header to half the scoreline Southampton won the match.

== Pre-match ==
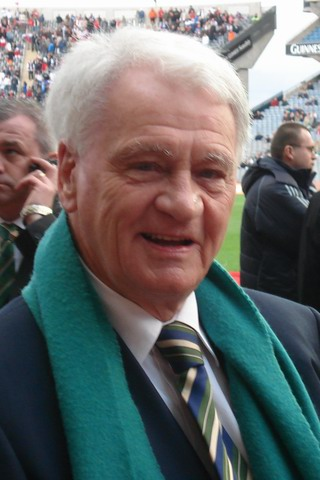
Sir Bobby Robson was the chief guest for the final, and presented the trophy to the winners

Arsenal was appearing in the final of the FA Cup for the sixteenth time. They had won the cup eight times previously (in 1930, 1936, 1950, 1971, 1979, 1993, 1998 and 2002) and had been beaten in the final seven times, the most recent in 2001. By comparison, Southampton made their fourth appearance in a FA Cup final. Their previous best was winning the cup in 1976, by beating opponents Manchester United.

Both clubs received an allocation of approximately 25,000 tickets, with the remaining 25,000 being sent out to other clubs. 17,500 of those tickets were available to Southampton season ticket holders. Seat prices for the final exceeded £80, with the cheapest tickets available at £25. Southampton was given the South Stand, which was the larger end of the stadium, whereas Arsenal was situated at the opposite end. Although Southampton supporters were disappointed at the allocation share, chairman Rupert Lowe refused to criticise the FA's decision, by saying: "The reality is that too many people want to go and there are never enough tickets." In the lead up to the final, the South Wales Echo reported that many tickets were being sold on the black market, for "20 times" the face-value price.

Nine days before the final, the two clubs faced each other in a league match at Highbury (Arsenal's former stadium). With Arsenal unable to retain the title, having lost to Leeds United, manager Arsène Wenger rested several players, as did Southampton manager Gordon Strachan, whose team started without six of their first-choice eleven. Winger Jermaine Pennant on his league debut scored a hat-trick, as did Pires, in a 6–1 win. Strachan believed the result had little bearing on their chances of winning the cup, noting: "There is little pressure on Southampton to lift the trophy. We were not expected to reach the final and have already clinched a place in the UEFA Cup."

The traditional Cup Final hymn, "Abide with Me" was sung by Tony Henry, an opera singer from South London. Sir Bobby Robson was invited as the FA's chief guest for the final and performed several duties ordinarily reserved for royalty, such as presenting the trophy to the winning captain. Heavy rain on Friday night and forecasted showers in Cardiff meant the final would be the first to be played indoors; the stadium closed its retractable roof and floodlights were used to light up the ground.

== Match ==
=== Team selection ===
Vieira was ruled out of the match because of a knee injury during the FA Cup semi-final match against Sheffield United, so Wenger named David Seaman as Arsenal's captain for the match. In a match widely anticipated as his final for the club. With Campbell suspended and Cygan absent due to a thigh strain, Wenger picked Oleh Luzhnyi to pair up with Martin Keown, who was rested the previous Sunday away against Sunderland. For Southampton, the major absentee was their striker Marian Pahars, who underwent a third operation to overcome a troubling knee injury. Defender Chris Baird made his second competitive start for the club and Chris Marsden captained Southampton, given Jason Dodd's absence with an injury. Although both teams set up in a 4–4–2 formation, Bergkamp was positioned as a deep-lying forward behind Henry.

=== Report ===
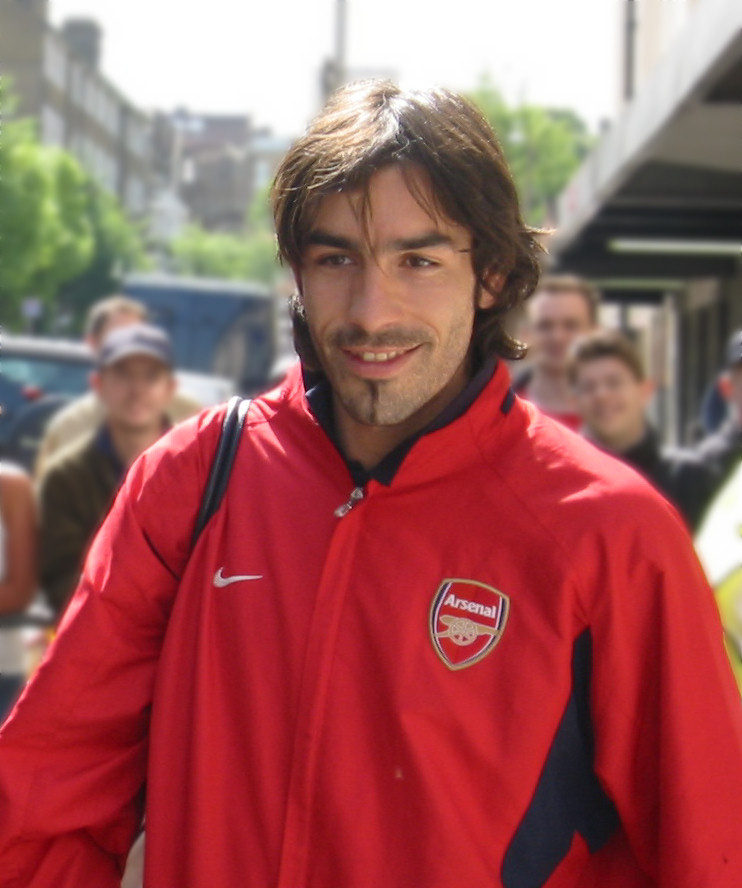
Robert Pires scored the only goal of the final

Arsenal created their first chance inside 24 seconds of the match, when Ljungberg put Henry clear down the right-hand side. The striker used his pace to get the better of Lundekvam, only to have his shot blocked by Southampton goalkeeper Antti Niemi. Bergkamp's goal effort in the eighth minute was cleared off the line by full back Chris Baird, after Niemi fumbled Henry's initial shot. Southampton fashioned their first opportunity in the 15th minute through a high cross; in spite of unsettling the Arsenal defence, the unmarked Svensson volleyed over the bar. Baird moments after won the ball in midfield and curled a shot that left Seaman "scrambling across his goal to save". Seven minutes before the break, Arsenal went into the lead. Henry, receiving the ball from Parlour, slipped it into Bergkamp down the right. He in turn fed the ball to Ljungberg, whose shot was blocked. The ball rebounded in the direction of Pires, who took one touch to set himself and another to fire into the goal at the near post, despite Niemi getting a hand to the ball. Arsenal missed further chances to extend their lead when a cross from the right by Henry was shot over the bar by Pires and from the same area, Bergkamp's "cross-cum-shot" was missed by Ljungberg.

After the break, Southampton applied pressure and a poor clearance by Seaman invited a chance for Paul Telfer to shoot the ball from "35 yards out"; his pass found Ormerod, but was eventually intercepted by Luzhnyi. Minutes after, Beattie failed to take advantage from Oakley's cross, as the ball drifted wide. Arsenal regained possession and in the 52nd minute went close to doubling their lead. In Southampton's penalty box, Bergkamp turned and beat Ormerod before curling a shot which Niemi palmed off; it fell to the feet of Ljungberg, who shot the ball into the side-netting. Telfer misguided his header from a Southampton corner, before Niemi denied Henry again. In the 65th minute, Niemi injured himself, in an attempt to clear the ball and was replaced by substitute Paul Jones. Both clubs made substitutions in the final third of the game, with Wiltord coming on for Bergkamp and Tessem replacing Svensson. Ormerod's goal-bound effort was saved by Seaman with 10 minutes remaining of the match. In the fourth minute of injury time, Southampton earned themselves a corner. Beattie's on-target header was cleared off the line by Ashley Cole and out for another corner, which Pires kicked out in the final action of the game.

=== Details ===
17 May 2003
15:00 BST

Arsenal	1–0	Southampton
Pires 38'	Report

Millennium Stadium, Cardiff
Attendance: 73,726
Referee: Graham Barber (Hertfordshire)

Arsenal	Southampton

GK	1	(England) David Seaman (c)
RB	12	(Cameroon) Lauren
CB	5	(England) Martin Keown	(yellow card) 30'
CB	22	(Ukraine) Oleh Luzhnyi
LB	3	(England) Ashley Cole
RM	7	(France) Robert Pires
CM	15	(England) Ray Parlour
CM	19	(Brazil) Gilberto Silva
LM	8	(Sweden) Freddie Ljungberg
SS	10	(Netherlands) Dennis Bergkamp		(substituted off) 77'
CF	14	(France) Thierry Henry	(yellow card) 66'
Substitutes:
GK	13	(England) Stuart Taylor
DF	28	(Ivory Coast) Kolo Touré
MF	16	(Netherlands) Giovanni van Bronckhorst
FW	11	(France) Sylvain Wiltord		(substituted on) 77'
FW	25	(Nigeria) Nwankwo Kanu
Manager:
(France) Arsène Wenger

GK	14	(Finland) Antti Niemi		(substituted off) 66'
RB	32	(Northern Ireland) Chris Baird		(substituted off) 86'
CB	5	(Norway) Claus Lundekvam
CB	11	(Sweden) Michael Svensson	(yellow card) 90'
LB	3	(England) Wayne Bridge
RM	33	(Scotland) Paul Telfer	(yellow card) 60'
CM	8	(England) Matthew Oakley
CM	12	(Sweden) Anders Svensson		(substituted off) 75'
LM	4	(England) Chris Marsden (c)	(yellow card) 77'
CF	36	(England) Brett Ormerod
CF	9	(England) James Beattie	(yellow card) 31'
Substitutes:
GK	1	(Wales) Paul Jones		(substituted on) 66'
DF	6	(England) Paul Williams
DF	19	(England) Danny Higginbotham
MF	29	(France) Fabrice Fernandes		(substituted on) 86'
FW	21	(Norway) Jo Tessem		(substituted on) 75'
Manager:
(Scotland) Gordon Strachan

Man of the match

- Thierry Henry (Arsenal)

Match officials

- Assistant referees:
  - Nigel Miller (County Durham)
  - Keith Stroud (Hampshire)
- Fourth official: Mike Dean (Cheshire)

Match rules

- 90 minutes.
- 30 minutes of extra-time if necessary.
- Penalty shootout if scores still level.
- Five named substitutes.
- Maximum of three substitutions.

=== Statistics ===
Statistic	Arsenal	Southampton
Goals scored	1	0
Possession	59%	41%
Shots on target	7	4
Shots off target	5	10
Corner kicks	4	8
Fouls	10	18
Offsides	3	3
Yellow cards	2	4
Red cards	0	0

== Post-match ==
In retaining the cup, Arsenal became the first team to do so since Tottenham Hotspur in 1982. Wenger commented after the game that his team "got the trophy we wanted" while Strachan was in admiration of Southampton's performance: "I'm very proud of the way they competed. I couldn't have asked for any more." Keown said the FA Cup win was "the best ever" and Seaman felt the disappointment of losing out to Manchester United in the league spurred the team on. Football pundits Alan Hansen, Peter Schmeichel and Mark Hughes unanimously agreed that Arsenal deserved to win the match.

Arsenal's victory set up a Community Shield match against Manchester United, the winners of the 2002–03 Premier League. The FA Cup winners are awarded qualification into the UEFA Cup, but because Arsenal qualified for the UEFA Champions League via their league position, the UEFA Cup place was passed to Southampton, the runners-up.

The match was broadcast live in the United Kingdom by both the BBC and Sky Sports, with BBC One providing the free-to-air coverage and Sky Sports 1 being the pay-TV alternative. BBC One held the majority of the viewership, with a peak audience of 9.6 million viewers (55.7% viewing share) watching at 16:50pm and the match averaged at 8.3 million (55%) – the highest audience for a FA Cup final in four years. Coverage of the final began on the channel at 12:10pm and averaged 5.3 million (44.4%). The Match of the Day coverage concluded at different times dependent on station, with the broadcast in Scotland ending 10 minutes before the main broadcast finished.

== See also ==
- 2003 Football League Cup Final
- 2003 FA Trophy Final
