= Chukki Eribenne =

English footballer (born 1980)

Personal information
- Full name: Chukwunyeaka Osondu Eribenne
- Date of birth: 2 November 1980 (age 45)
- Place of birth: Westminster, London, England
- Height: 5 ft 10 in (1.78 m)
- Position: Striker

Youth career
- Years: Team
- ?–1998: Coventry City
2002	→ Helsingborgs IF (loan)	?	(?)
2002–2003	AFC Bournemouth	47	(1)
2002–2003	→ Hereford United (loan)	3	(0)
2003–2004	Havant & Waterlooville	?	(?)
2004–2007	Weymouth	113	(90)
2004–2005	→ Aldershot Town (loan)	3	(0)
2005	→ Farnborough Town (loan)	4	(1)
2007	Grays Athletic	4	(0)
2007	→ Gravesend & Northfleet (loan)	10	(1)
2007–2008	Ebbsfleet United	31	(10)
2008–2009	Sutton United	27	(7)
2009–2010	Hinckley United	2	(2)
2010	Ilkeston Town	1	(0)
Total		355	(112)

Chukwunyeaka Osondu "Chukki" Eribenne (born 2 November 1980) is an English former professional footballer.

== Career ==
Born on 2 November 1980, in Westminster, Eribenne began his career at Coventry City but didn't make an appearance for the first team. He joined AFC Bournemouth in 2000 and scored on his debut against Bristol Rovers, but didn't score any further goals for the club. He had a loan spell at Hereford where he scored twice; both goals coming in a Football League Trophy defeat to Northampton Town. He subsequently moved to Havant & Waterlooville, for whom he was Player of the Year in 2003–04.

In summer 2004, Eribenne signed for Weymouth. He was Weymouth's joint top scorer in 2005–06 with 13 goals as they won promotion to the Conference. He later moved to Grays Athletic, before signing for Ebbsfleet United. He was released at the end of the 2007–08 and went to Sutton United. After one season at Sutton, Eribenne moved back to the Midlands and signed for his local club Hinckley United. After a season with Hinckley, Eribenne moved on to Ilkeston Town. His short spell was brought to an end after the club dissolved.

== Honours ==
- Conference South: 2006
- FA Trophy: 2008
