= Hassan Kachloul =

Moroccan footballer (born 1973)

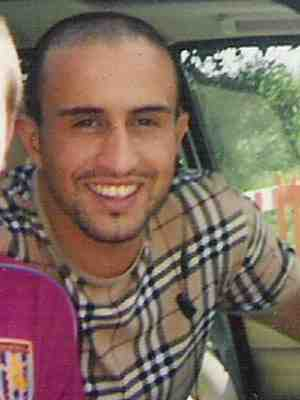
- Kachloul at the Aston Villa training ground

Personal information
- Full name: Hassan Kachloul
- Date of birth: 19 February 1973 (age 53)
- Place of birth: Agadir, Morocco
- Height: 1.85 m (6 ft 1 in)
- Position: Midfielder

Youth career
- 1988–1991: Nîmes

Senior career*
Years	Team	Apps	(Gls)
1992–1995	Nîmes	86	(26)
1995–1998	Metz	7	(0)
1996–1997	→ Dunkerque (loan)	28	(6)
1997–1998	→ Saint-Étienne (loan)	16	(0)
1998–2001	Southampton	86	(14)
2001–2004	Aston Villa	22	(2)
2003–2004	→ Wolverhampton Wanderers (loan)	4	(0)
2005	Livingston	8	(2)
Total		257	(50)

International career
1994–2002	Morocco	12	(0)
- * Club domestic league appearances and goals

Hassan Kachloul (Arabic: حسان كشلول; born 19 February 1973) is a Moroccan former professional footballer who played as a midfielder. He played for the Morocco national team and was a squad member at the 1994 FIFA World Cup.

== Career ==
Born in Agadir, Morocco, Kachloul was raised in Belleville in France and spent his early career in French football, with Nîmes Olympique, before signing for FC Metz, who loaned him to USL Dunkerque and AS Saint-Étienne respectively. He holds Moroccan and French nationalities.

After being released by his parent club FC Metz at his own request, and not being part of the Morocco squad for the 1998 FIFA World Cup, he spent a spell searching for a new club before moving to England, joining top flight Southampton in October 1998. He remained at The Dell until June 2001 when he joined Aston Villa after his contract expired. He had originally made a verbal agreement to join Ipswich Town, and was celebrated as a crucial signing, but changed his mind at the last minute to head to Villa Park.

Kachloul was signed by John Gregory and played almost all his games for the club under him. After Gregory resigned in January 2002, he was frozen out by, firstly, Graham Taylor, and later David O'Leary.

The midfielder left Aston Villa in July 2004, after failing to appear for the club in the 2003–04 season. He had spent five months on loan at fellow Premier League side Wolves during the campaign, but had only managed four games, after suffering injury and illness.

After a spell as a free agent, he joined Livingston, where he helped the club avoid relegation. His time at Livingston was somewhat overshadowed due to the suspicious circumstances of his transfer. As he had joined as a free agent, and was signed outside the transfer window, he played under 'amateur' status. However, this was found to be unsound as he was discovered to be receiving an income from Livingston. The SPL ruled that as the player could have been signed as a professional and there had been no need to sign him as an amateur on 31 March 2005. Livingston argued that they had gained no competitive advantage from this situation, and therefore a points deduction was not imposed. The club was fined £15,000.

After leaving Livingston, he had a trial at Derby County in late 2005, but was not signed and has since retired. He currently works as a property developer.

== Career statistics ==
Appearances and goals by club, season and competition
Club	Season	League			National Cup		League Cup		Other		Total	
Club	Season	Division	Apps	Goals	Apps	Goals	Apps	Goals	Apps	Goals	Apps	Goals
Nîmes
Nîmes	1992–93	Division 1	17	1	1	0	—		—		18	1
Nîmes	1993–94	Division 2	37	17	1	0	—		—		38	17
Nîmes	1994–95	Division 2	32	8	0	0	0	0	—		32	8
Nîmes	Total		86	26	2	0	0	0	0	0	88	26
Metz
Metz	1995–96	Division 1	0	0	0	0	0	0	0	0	0	0
Metz	1996–97	Division 1	7	0	0	0	0	0	1 (Note: Appearances in UEFA Europa League)	0	8	0
Metz	1997–98	Division 1	0	0	0	0	0	0	0	0	0	0
Metz	Total		7	0	0	0	0	0	1	0	8	0
Dunkerque (loan)	1995–96	Division 2	28	6	1	0	2	0	—		31	6
Saint-Étienne (loan)	1997–98	Division 2	16	0	0	0	0	0	—		16	0
Southampton
Southampton	1998–99	Premier League	22	5	2	0	0	0	—		24	5
Southampton	1999–2000	Premier League	32	5	1	0	4	0	—		37	5
Southampton	2000–01	Premier League	32	4	3	1	1	0	—		36	5
Southampton	Total		86	14	6	1	5	0	0	0	97	15
Aston Villa
Aston Villa	2001–02	Premier League	22	2	0	0	2	0	7 (Note: Appearances in Intertoto Cup and UEFA Europa League)	0	31	2
Aston Villa	2002–03	Premier League	0	0	0	0	0	0	1 (Note: Appearances in Intertoto Cup)	0	1	0
Aston Villa	Total		22	2	0	0	2	0	8	0	32	2
Wolverhampton Wanderers (loan)	2003–04	Premier League	4	0	0	0	0	0	—		4	0
Livingston	2004–05	Scottish Premier League	8	2	0	0	0	0	—		8	2
Career total			257	50	9	1	9	0	9	0	284	51

== Honours ==
Aston Villa

- UEFA Intertoto Cup: 2001
