= Paul Jones (footballer, born 1967) =

Welsh footballer (born 1967)

Personal information
- Full name: Paul Steven Jones
- Date of birth: 18 April 1967 (age 59)
- Place of birth: Chirk, Wales
- Height: 6 ft 3 in (1.91 m)
- Position: Goalkeeper

Senior career*
Years	Team	Apps	(Gls)
1986–1991	Kidderminster Harriers	242	(0)
1991–1996	Wolverhampton Wanderers	33	(0)
1996–1997	Stockport County	47	(0)
1997–2004	Southampton	193	(0)
2004	→ Liverpool (loan)	2	(0)
2004–2006	Wolverhampton Wanderers	26	(0)
2004–2005	→ Watford (loan)	9	(0)
2005	→ Millwall (loan)	3	(0)
2006–2007	Queens Park Rangers	26	(0)
2007–2008	Bognor Regis Town	2	(0)
Total		583	(0)

International career
1997–2006	Wales	50	(0)
- * Club domestic league appearances and goals

Paul Steven Jones (born 18 April 1967) is a retired Welsh international football goalkeeper. During his playing career, he played for several clubs, including Wolverhampton Wanderers, Stockport County and Southampton.

== Career history ==
=== Club career ===
Born in Chirk near Wrexham, and educated in Shropshire at the Thomas Adams School in Wem, Jones started his career at Bridgnorth Town, joining Kidderminster Harriers in 1986 and then moved to Wolverhampton Wanderers for a fee of £60,000 in 1991. He only managed to play 44 games before moving on to Stockport County in 1996 where he was ever present in the 1996–97 season.

When Stockport County manager Dave Jones joined Southampton as manager, he signed Jones. He won Southampton player of the season in 1998 and earned a call up to Wales and became the number one goalkeeper. He played for Southampton in the 2003 FA Cup final against Arsenal (which was lost 1–0) coming on as substitute for the injured Antti Niemi. He was the first ever goalkeeper to make a substitute appearance in an FA Cup final.

He left Southampton in 2004, but not before joining Liverpool on loan during a goalkeeping injury crisis, thus becoming the club's oldest post-war debutant.

Jones re-joined Wolverhampton Wanderers in January 2004, but was loaned out to Watford in December of that year. In January 2006, Wolves cancelled Jones' contract by mutual consent. In February 2006, he joined Queens Park Rangers for the rest of the 2005–06 season. Due to his success at the club he was given a one-year extension to his contract that would last up until May 2007. When this contract expired Jones was released by the London club and later signed for non-league Bognor Regis Town.

=== International career ===
Jones made his international debut against Scotland on 27 May 1997, coming on as a half-time substitute for Andy Marriott.

Jones won his 50th Welsh cap against Slovakia on 7 October 2006 but had a match to forget. Wales were beaten 5–1, their worst home result for 98 years and he was beaten from long range on three occasions. He marked the occasion with 50 shaved in his hair.

== Honours ==
Kidderminster Harriers

- FA Trophy: 1986–87

Stockport County

- Football League Second Division second-place promotion: 1996–97

Southampton

- FA Cup runner-up: 2002–03

Individual

- Welsh Footballer of the Year: 1999
