= Michael Svensson =

Swedish footballer

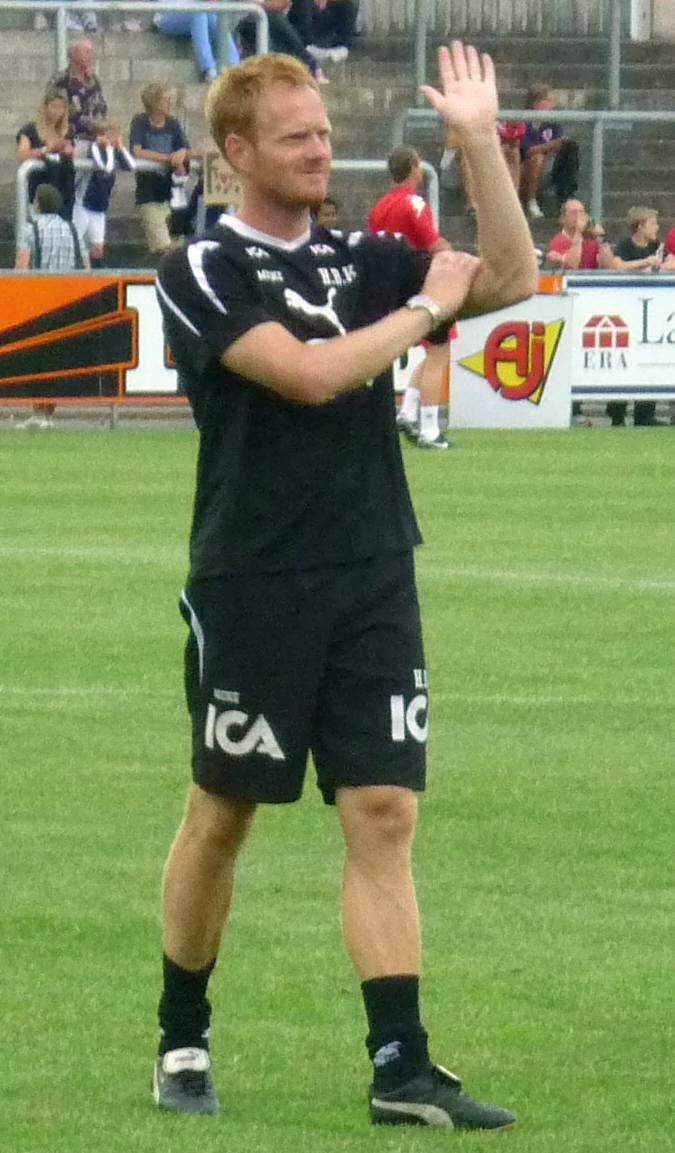

Personal information
- Full name: Michael Lennart Svensson
- Date of birth: 25 November 1975 (age 50)
- Place of birth: Värnamo, Sweden
- Height: 1.88 m (6 ft 2 in)
- Position: Centre back

Youth career
- 1993–1995: Skillingaryds IS

Senior career*
Years	Team	Apps	(Gls)
1995–1998	IFK Värnamo	89	(6)
1998–2001	Halmstads BK	78	(5)
2001–2002	Troyes	23	(1)
2002–2007	Southampton	67	(4)
2008–2009	Southampton	4	(0)
2011–2013	Halmstads BK	16	(0)
Total		277	(16)

International career
1999–2003	Sweden	25	(0)
- * Club domestic league appearances and goals

Michael Lennart Svensson (born 25 November 1975) is a Swedish former professional footballer who played as a centre back. He represented IFK Värnamo, Halmstads BK, Troyes, and Southampton during a career that spanned between 1995 and 2013. A full international between 1999 and 2003, he won 25 caps for the Sweden national team and was part of their squad for the 2002 FIFA World Cup.

== Club career ==
=== Early career ===
Svensson started his career in his home country, playing for various Swedish clubs including IFK Värnamo and Halmstads BK. He began to be noticed by bigger clubs when Halmstads BK won the Swedish championship in 2000.

=== Troyes ===
He was transferred to Troyes AC in 2001, helping the club to seventh position in the French First Division in his only season. On 25 June 2002, Svensson was signed by Premier League club Southampton F.C. for £2m.

=== Southampton ===
Svensson arrived at Southampton just after being a member of Sweden's squad at the 2002 World Cup. He immediately struck up a rapport with Claus Lundekvam at the centre of the Saints defence. He is a tough tackling, no nonsense centre-half but likes to play the ball out of defence and get forward to help out in attack. His nickname with both fans and press is "Killer".

Svensson holds the honour of scoring the last ever competitive goal at Maine Road on 11 May 2003, in a game won by Southampton 1–0.

Due to a serious knee injury sustained at the end of the 2003–04 season, he missed the entire 2004–05 season. He returned to action in October 2005 but, after only seven games, he broke down again and remained out of action for the remainder of the 2005–06 season. He failed to return to full fitness in time for the start of the 2006–07 championship season due to a kick in the knee during an Aldershot reserves game in the 2006 pre-season. Since then, he has flown to Germany to continue treatment with FC Bayern Munich doctor Hans-Wilhelm Müller-Wohlfahrt. On 23 May 2007, it was announced that Svensson would undergo further surgery in an attempt to save his career. The procedure was expected to put him out of action for over a year, throwing a major question mark over his future. His contract with the Saints expired on 30 June 2007, and was not renewed as Southampton face up to the financial realities of a third season in the Championship.

In July 2008, Southampton announced that Svensson "could be on the verge of a remarkable footballing comeback" following a visit to a specialist rehabilitation centre in Italy. Svensson returned to training with a view to being re-signed by Southampton for the 2008–09 season. He completed a pre-season friendly against Winchester City in July 2008 and was in with a chance of making a full recovery from his injury. He captained the Southampton side which drew 2–2 with West Ham United in the Ted Bates Trophy.

On 7 August 2008 he agreed terms with Southampton and was appointed club captain. Two days later, he completed his remarkable comeback, playing 90 minutes in Southampton's first Championship match of the season, a 2–1 defeat to Cardiff City, his first competitive game for the club since a match against Hull City on 22 November 2005. A week later, prior to the home game against Birmingham City, Southampton and Svensson agreed terms signing a 12 months contract. He played three more league games that month, with his final competitive appearance coming in the League Cup against Rotherham United on 23 September 2008.

On 24 January 2009, Svensson joined new manager Mark Wotte's coaching staff as an assistant first team coach alongside Dean Gorré.

On 25 June 2009, Svensson announced his retirement from the playing side of the game, exactly seven years to the day after he was first unveiled at St. Mary's as Gordon Strachan's only summer signing of 2002 and thus severed the last remaining link on the playing side with the 2003 FA Cup final, in which he had played the full 90 minutes.

=== Return to playing ===
During the 2011 season, as Halmstads BK struggled both at the bottom of the table and economically, Michael Svensson decided that he would try one last comeback, stating that he didn't feel any major problems with his earlier injuries, and that he was already training with the team, however limitedly. He made his comeback against IFK Norrköping on 7 August, as he came on in the 89th minute of the game.

== International career ==
He made his debut in the Sweden national team on 17 August 1999 against Austria. He was a member of the Sweden squad for the 2002 FIFA World Cup, where he was not played. He has 25 caps for his country. He was initially named in Sweden's UEFA Euro 2004 squad but had to withdraw through injury and was replaced by Alexander Östlund.

== Coaching career ==
Following his retirement from playing, Svensson announced that he would return home to Sweden and take up a career as manager, stating that he would prefer to start in Division 2 or 3. Following that, his former club Halmstads BK were looking for a new manager and rumours started that he was going to get the position; on 17 December 2009 he was presented as the club's new assistant manager alongside Lars Jacobsson. As of 2016, Svensson is head coach for Halmstad BK:s U-19 team.

== Career statistics ==
=== International ===
Appearances and goals by national team and year
National team	Year	Apps	Goals
Sweden	1999	1	0
Sweden	2000	2	0
Sweden	2001	5	0
Sweden	2002	8	0
Sweden	2003	9	0
Total		25	0

== Honours ==
Halmstads BK

- Allsvenskan: 2000

Southampton

- FA Cup runner-up: 2002–03
