= 1997–98 Juventus FC season =

Italian football club season

Juventus
1997–98 season
- President: Vittorio Chiusano
- Manager: Marcello Lippi
- Stadium: Stadio delle Alpi
- Serie A: 1st
- Coppa Italia: Semi-finals
- Supercoppa Italiana: Winners
- UEFA Champions League: Runners-up
- Top goalscorer: League: Alessandro Del Piero (21); All: Alessandro Del Piero (32)
Home colours	Away colours	Third colours

Juventus Football Club had one of its most successful seasons in the club's history, winning the domestic league competition and reaching the final of the Champions League. There, Juventus stumbled on Real Madrid by Predrag Mijatović' solitary goal, which ensured Juventus lost the final for the second year running. The progress to the final had been much less smooth than in the 1995–96 and 1996–97 European campaigns, prompting fears among supporters that the side was experiencing a decline. Indeed, on their way to the final in Amsterdam, the Italians had lost three games compared to none the previous season. They had needed to win their matchday six fixture against Manchester United to reach the quarter-final, where Dynamo Kyiv held them to a 1–1 draw in Turin in the first leg.

Alessandro Del Piero and Filippo Inzaghi, combined with French playmaker Zinedine Zidane, were the main reasons for Juventus' success. Rather than relying on the tight defence of 1996–97's league title, Juventus had two of the league's top scorers.

== Players ==
Note: Flags indicate national team as defined under FIFA eligibility rules; some limited exceptions apply. Players may hold more than one non-FIFA nationality.

No.	Pos.	Nation	Player
1	GK	ITA	Angelo Peruzzi (vice-captain)
2	DF	ITA	Ciro Ferrara
3	DF	ITA	Moreno Torricelli
4	DF	URU	Paolo Montero
5	MF	ITA	Fabio Pecchia
6	DF	POR	Dimas
7	MF	ITA	Angelo Di Livio
8	MF	ITA	Antonio Conte (captain)
9	FW	ITA	Filippo Inzaghi
10	FW	ITA	Alessandro Del Piero
11	FW	ITA	Michele Padovano
12	GK	ITA	Michelangelo Rampulla
13	DF	ITA	Mark Iuliano
14	MF	FRA	Didier Deschamps
15	DF	ITA	Alessandro Birindelli
16	FW	ITA	Nicola Amoruso

No.	Pos.	Nation	Player
17	GK	ITA	Morgan De Sanctis
18	FW	URU	Daniel Fonseca
20	MF	ITA	Alessio Tacchinardi
21	MF	FRA	Zinedine Zidane
22	DF	ITA	Gianluca Pessotto
23	DF	ITA	Marco Zamboni
24	MF	ITA	Raffaele Ametrano
25	DF	URU	César Pellegrín
26	MF	NED	Edgar Davids
27	FW	URU	Marcelo Zalayeta
30	DF	ITA	Rudy Nicoletto
31	DF	ITA	Salvatore Aronica
32	FW	ITA	Luigi Giandomenico
33	DF	ITA	Massimiliano Zazzetta
35	MF	ITA	Marco Rigoni

=== Transfers ===
In
Pos.	Name	from	Type
FW	Filippo Inzaghi	Atalanta B.C.	
DF	Alessandro Birindelli	Empoli F.C.	
FW	Daniel Fonseca	A.S. Roma	
MF	Fabio Pecchia	S.S.C. Napoli	
MF	Marco Zamboni	Chievo Verona	

Out
Pos.	Name	To	Type
FW	Alen Boksic	S.S. Lazio	
FW	Christian Vieri	Atletico Madrid	
MF	Attilio Lombardo	Crystal Palace	
MF	Vladimir Jugovic	S.S. Lazio	
DF	Sergio Porrini	Glasgow Rangers	
GK	Davide Falcioni	Treviso	
DF	Massimiliano Notari	Triestina	
MF	Ivano Trotta	Fiorenzuola	

==== Winter ====
In
Pos.	Name	from	Type
MF	Edgar Davids	A.C. Milan	
DF	Cesar Pellegrin	Danubio F.C.	
FW	Marcelo Zalayeta	Peñarol	

Out
Pos.	Name	To	Type
DF	Marco Zamboni	S.S.C. Napoli	
MF	Raffaele Ametrano	Empoli F.C.	
FW	Michele Padovano	Crystal Palace	

== Competitions ==
=== Supercoppa Italiana ===
23 August 1997	Juventus	3–0	Vicenza	Stadio delle Alpi, Turin
20:30 CET	Inzaghi 4', 10'; Conte 80'	Report		Attendance: 16,157; Referee: Livio Bazzoli

=== Serie A ===
==== League table ====
Pos	Team	Pld	W	D	L	GF	GA	GD	Pts	Qualification or relegation
1	Juventus (C)	34	21	11	2	67	28	+39	74	Qualification to Champions League group stage
2	Internazionale	34	21	6	7	62	27	+35	69	Qualification to Champions League second qualifying round
3	Udinese	34	19	7	8	62	40	+22	64	Qualification to UEFA Cup
4	Roma	34	16	11	7	67	42	+25	59	Qualification to UEFA Cup
5	Fiorentina	34	15	12	7	65	36	+29	57 (Note: Fiorentina finished ahead of Parma on head-to-head points: FIO 1–1 PAR; PAR 1–2 FIO.)	Qualification to UEFA Cup

Source: 1997–98 Serie A, RSSSF.com, Soccerway
Rules for classification: 1) Points; 2) Head-to-head points; 3) Head-to-head goal difference; 4) Goal difference; 5) Goals scored; 6) Draw. (Note: Head-to-head record is used only after all the matches between the teams in question have been played).
(C) Champions

==== Results by round ====
Round	1	2	3	4	5	6	7	8	9	10	11	12	13	14	15	16	17	18	19	20	21	22	23	24	25	26	27	28	29	30	31	32	33	34
Ground	H	A	H	A	H	A	H	A	H	A	H	A	H	A	H	A	H	A	H	A	H	A	H	A	H	A	H	A	H	A	H	A	H	A
Result	W	D	W	D	W	W	W	W	D	D	W	D	W	L	W	W	W	W	W	D	W	L	W	D	D	D	W	W	W	W	W	D	W	D
Position	1	3	2	3	2	2	2	2	2	2	2	2	2	2	2	2	1	1	1	1	1	1	1	1	1	1	1	1	1	1	1	1	1	1

Source: Competitive matches
A = Away; H = Home; W = Win; D = Draw; L = Loss; P = Postponed; = Leader, 1998–99 UEFA Champions League Group stage; = 1998–99 UEFA Champions League Second Qualifying round; = 1998–99 UEFA Cup First round

==== Matches ====
31 August 1997 1	Juventus	2–0	Lecce	Turin
16:00 CEST (UTC+02:00)	Inzaghi 84'; Conte 90+4'	Report		Stadium: Stadio delle Alpi; Referee: Gennaro Borriello

14 September 1997 2	Roma	0–0	Juventus	Rome
20:30 CEST (UTC+02:00)		Report		Stadium: Stadio Olimpico; Referee: Fiorenzo Treossi

21 September 1997 3	Juventus	4–0	Brescia	Turin
16:00 CEST (UTC+02:00)	Filippini 7' (o.g.); Conte 36'; Inzaghi 38'; Del Piero 56'	Report		Stadium: Stadio delle Alpi; Referee: Massimo De Santis

27 September 1997 4	Sampdoria	1–1	Juventus	Genoa
16:00 CEST (UTC+02:00)	Morales 16'	Report	Inzaghi 90+2'	Stadium: Stadio Luigi Ferraris; Referee: Robert Anthony Boggi

5 October 1997 5	Juventus	2–1	Fiorentina	Turin
15:30 CEST (UTC+02:00)	Inzaghi 33'; Del Piero 36'	Report	Pessotto 24' (o.g.)	Stadium: Stadio delle Alpi; Referee: Livio Bazzoli

19 October 1997 6	Bari	0–5	Juventus	Bari
15:30 CEST (UTC+02:00)		Report	Ingesson 45+2' (o.g.); Zidane 63', 81'; Del Piero 88'; Garzya 90' (o.g.)	Stadium: Stadio San Nicola; Referee: Piero Ceccarini

1 November 1997 7	Juventus	4–1	Udinese	Turin
14:30 CET (UTC+01:00)	Conte 36'; Inzaghi 68'; Del Piero 72' (pen.); Amoruso 89'	Report	Locatelli 14'	Stadium: Stadio delle Alpi; Referee: Graziano Cesari

9 November 1997 8	Napoli	1–2	Juventus	Naples
20:30 CET (UTC+01:00)	Bellucci 58'	Report	Zidane 38'; Fonseca 88'	Stadium: Stadio San Paolo; Referee: Stefano Braschi

23 November 1997 9	Juventus	2–2	Parma	Turin
14:30 CET (UTC+01:00)	Del Piero 43'; Amoruso 82'	Report	Chiesa 34'; Crespo 45'	Stadium: Stadio delle Alpi; Referee: Fiorenzo Treossi

30 November 1997 10	Milan	1–1	Juventus	Milan
20:30 CET (UTC+01:00)	Ferrara 27' (o.g.)	Report	Inzaghi 32'	Stadium: San Siro; Referee: Domenico Messina

6 December 1997 11	Juventus	2–1	Lazio	Turin
14:30 CET (UTC+01:00)	Del Piero 15', 34' (pen.)	Report	Marcolin 26' (pen.)	Stadium: Stadio delle Alpi; Referee: Robert Anthony Boggi

14 December 1997 12	Piacenza	1–1	Juventus	Piacenza
14:30 CET (UTC+01:00)	Piovani 80'	Report	Fonseca 78'	Stadium: Stadio Leonardo Garilli; Referee: Stefano Farina

21 December 1997 13	Juventus	5–2	Empoli	Turin
14:30 CET (UTC+01:00)	Inzaghi 15'; Del Piero 16', 27', 55'; Tonetto 79' (o.g.)	Report	Florijančič 41'; C. Esposito 74' (pen.)	Stadium: Stadio delle Alpi; Referee: Tarcisio Serena

4 January 1998 14	Internazionale	1–0	Juventus	Milan
20:30 CET (UTC+01:00)	Djorkaeff 47'	Report		Stadium: San Siro; Referee: Stefano Braschi

11 January 1998 15	Juventus	2–0	Vicenza	Turin
14:30 CET (UTC+01:00)	Del Piero 27' (pen.); Ferrara 76'	Report		Stadium: Stadio delle Alpi; Referee: Daniele Tombolini

18 January 1998 16	Bologna	1–3	Juventus	Bologna
14:30 CET (UTC+01:00)	Kolyvanov 90+3'	Report	Inzaghi 10', 20'; Del Piero 60'	Stadium: Stadio Renato Dall'Ara; Referee: Livio Bazzoli

25 January 1998 17	Juventus	3–1	Atalanta	Turin
14:30 CET (UTC+01:00)	Conte 65'; Zidane 72', 90+2'	Report	Caccia 71'	Stadium: Stadio delle Alpi; Referee: Cosimo Bolognino

1 February 1998 18	Lecce	0–2	Juventus	Lecce
14:30 CET (UTC+01:00)		Report	Iuliano 45+2'; Del Piero 89'	Stadium: Stadio Via del Mare; Referee: Pierluigi Collina

8 February 1998 19	Juventus	3–1	Roma	Turin
14:30 CET (UTC+01:00)	Zidane 45+2'; Del Piero 49'; Davids 65'	Report	Paulo Sérgio 57'	Stadium: Stadio delle Alpi; Referee: Domenico Messina

11 February 1998 20	Brescia	1–1	Juventus	Brescia
20:30 CET (UTC+01:00)	Savino 73'	Report	Inzaghi 52'	Stadium: Stadio Mario Rigamonti; Referee: Roberto Bettin

15 February 1998 21	Juventus	3–0	Sampdoria	Turin
20:30 CET (UTC+01:00)	Del Piero 5'; Inzaghi 11'; Fonseca 78'	Report		Stadium: Stadio delle Alpi; Referee: Pasquale Rodomonti P.

22 February 1998 22	Fiorentina	3–0	Juventus	Florence
15:00 CET (UTC+01:00)	Firicano 31'; Oliveira 34'; Robbiati 79'	Report		Stadium: Stadio Artemio Franchi; Referee: Graziano Cesari

28 February 1998 23	Juventus	1–0	Bari	Turin
15:00 CET (UTC+01:00)	Neqrouz 19' (o.g.)	Report		Stadium: Stadio delle Alpi; Referee: Massimo De Santis

8 March 1998 24	Udinese	1–1	Juventus	Udine
15:00 CET (UTC+01:00)	Bachini 76'	Report	Del Piero 89'	Stadium: Stadio Friuli; Referee: Piero Ceccarini

14 March 1998 25	Juventus	2–2	Napoli	Turin
15:00 CET (UTC+01:00)	Del Piero 45+1'; Zalayeta 75'	Report	Turrini 69'; Protti 90+2'	Stadium: Stadio delle Alpi; Referee: Salvatore Racalbuto

22 March 1998 26	Parma	2–2	Juventus	Parma
15:00 CET (UTC+01:00)	Stanić 36'; Crippa 40'	Report	Tacchinardi 55'; Inzaghi 60'	Stadium: Stadio Ennio Tardini; Referee: Robert Anthony Boggi

28 March 1998 27	Juventus	4–1	Milan	Turin
20:30 CET (UTC+01:00)	Del Piero 12' (pen.), 39'; Inzaghi 60', 83'	Report	Boban 33' (pen.)	Stadium: Stadio delle Alpi; Referee: Stefano Braschi

5 April 1998 28	Lazio	0–1	Juventus	Rome
20:30 CEST (UTC+02:00)		Report	Inzaghi 60'	Stadium: Stadio Olimpico; Referee: Pierluigi Collina

11 April 1998 29	Juventus	2–0	Piacenza	Turin
16:00 CEST (UTC+02:00)	Zidane 53'; Del Piero 81'	Report		Stadium: Stadio delle Alpi; Referee: Gennaro Borriello

19 April 1998 30	Empoli	0–1	Juventus	Empoli
16:00 CEST (UTC+02:00)		Report	Pecchia 70'	Stadium: Stadio Carlo Castellani; Referee: Pasquale Rodomonti P.

26 April 1998 31	Juventus	1–0	Internazionale	Turin
16:00 CEST (UTC+02:00)	Del Piero 21'	Report		Stadium: Stadio delle Alpi; Referee: Piero Ceccarini

3 May 1998 32	Vicenza	0–0	Juventus	Vicenza
16:00 CEST (UTC+02:00)		Report		Stadium: Stadio Romeo Menti; Referee: Graziano Cesari

10 May 1998 33	Juventus	3–2	Bologna	Turin
16:00 CEST (UTC+02:00)	Inzaghi 34', 50', 81'	Report	Kolyvanov 11'; R. Baggio 56'	Stadium: Stadio delle Alpi; Referee: Robert Anthony Boggi

15 May 1998 34	Atalanta	1–1	Juventus	Bergamo
20:30 CEST (UTC+02:00)	Caccia 45+3' (pen.)	Report	Fonseca 69'	Stadium: Stadio Atleti Azzurri d'Italia; Referee: Livio Bazzoli

=== Coppa Italia ===
==== Round of 32 ====
4 September 1997 First Leg	Brescello	1–1	Juventus	Reggio Emilia
	Franzini 42'		Conte 56'	Stadium: Stadio Giglio; Referee: Bettin

24 September 1997 Second Leg	Juventus	4–0 (5–1 agg.)	Brescello	Turin
	Delpiano 6' (o.g.); Amoruso 47' (pen.); Fonseca 68', 86'			Stadium: Stadio delle Alpi; Referee: Preschern

==== Round of 16 ====
15 October 1997 First Leg	Juventus	2–0	Lecce	Turin
	Amoruso 32'; Del Piero 54'			Stadium: Stadio delle Alpi; Referee: Bolognino

19 November 1997 Second Leg	Lecce	0–1 (0–3 agg.)	Juventus	Lecce
			Birindelli 26'	Stadium: Stadio Via del Mare; Referee: Serena

==== Quarterfinals ====
7 January 1998 First Leg	Fiorentina	2–2	Juventus	Florence
	Rui Costa 5'; Montero 42' (o.g.)		Inzaghi 64'; Zidane 73'	Stadium: Stadio Artemio Franchi; Referee: Treossi

20 January 1998 Second Leg	Juventus	0–0 (2a–2 agg.)	Fiorentina	Turin
				Stadium: Stadio delle Alpi; Referee: Rodomonti

==== Semifinals ====
19 February 1998 First Leg	Juventus	0–1	Lazio	Turin
			Bokšić 22'	Stadium: Stadio delle Alpi; Referee: Treossi

11 March 1998 Second Leg	Lazio	2–2 (3–2 agg.)	Juventus	Rome
	Nedvěd 62', 66'		Fonseca 35'; Favalli 90+3' (o.g.)	Stadium: stadium Olimpico; Referee: Pellegrino

=== UEFA Champions League ===
==== Group stage ====
Pos	Team	Pld	W	D	L	GF	GA	GD	Pts	Qualification
1	(England) Manchester United	6	5	0	1	14	5	+9	15	Advance to knockout stage
2	(Italy) Juventus	6	4	0	2	12	8	+4	12	Advance to knockout stage
3	(Netherlands) Feyenoord	6	3	0	3	8	10	−2	9	
4	(Slovakia) Košice	6	0	0	6	2	13	−11	0	

Source: UEFA

17 September 1997 1	Juventus (Italy)	5–1	(Netherlands) Feyenoord	Turin, Italy
20:45 CEST (UTC+02:00)	Del Piero 3' (pen.), 11'; Ferrara (yellow card) 24'; Conte (yellow card) 28'; Inzaghi 34'; Di Livio (red card) 57'; Zidane 67'; Tacchinardi (yellow card) 69'; Birindelli 81'	Report	Van Gobbel (yellow card) 17'; Bosvelt (yellow card) 41'; Cruz (yellow card) 44'; Van Gastel 58' (pen.)	Stadium: Stadio delle Alpi; Attendance: 24,000; Referee: Bernd Heynemann (Germany)

1 October 1997 2	Manchester United (England)	3–2	(Italy) Juventus	Manchester, England
20:45 CEST (UTC+02:00)	Sheringham 37'; Giggs (yellow card) 45', (goal) 89'; Scholes 69'	Report	Del Piero 1', (yellow card) 58'; Pecchia (yellow card) 14'; Ferrara (yellow card) 53'; Deschamps (yellow card) 66' (red card) 66'; Zidane 90'	Stadium: Old Trafford; Attendance: 53,428; Referee: Antonio Jesús López Nieto (Spain)

22 October 1997 3	Košice (Slovakia)	0–1	(Italy) Juventus	Košice, Slovakia
20:45 CEST (UTC+02:00)	Dzúrik (yellow card) 39'; Lubarskyi (yellow card) 51'; Špilár (yellow card) 53'	Report	Dimas (yellow card) 30'; Del Piero 34'; Pessotto (yellow card) 59'	Stadium: Všešportový areál Attendance: 10,021; Referee: Edgar Steinborn (Germany)

5 November 1997 4	Juventus (Italy)	3–2	(Slovakia) Košice	Turin, Italy
20:45 CET (UTC+01:00)	Conte (yellow card) 33'; Del Piero 42'; Amoruso 59'; Fonseca 60'	Report	Lyubarskyi 66'; Ferrara 70' (o.g.)	Stadium: Stadio delle Alpi; Attendance: 3,500; Referee: Juan Ansuátegui Roca (Spain)

26 November 1997 5	Feyenoord (Netherlands)	2–0	(Italy) Juventus	Rotterdam, Netherlands
20:45 CET (UTC+01:00)	Boateng (yellow card) 21'; Cruz 66', 87', (yellow card) 73'; Van Wonderen (yellow card) 79'	Report	Del Piero (yellow card) 38'; Torricelli (yellow card) 83'	Stadium: Feijenoord Stadion; Attendance: 35,000; Referee: Nikolai Levnikov (Russia)

10 December 1997 6	Juventus (Italy)	1–0	(England) Manchester United	Turin, Italy
20:45 CET (UTC+01:00)	Zidane (yellow card) 60'; Inzaghi 84'	Report	Berg (yellow card) 77'	Stadium: Stadio delle Alpi; Attendance: 47,786; Referee: Gilles Veissière (France)

==== Knockout phase ====
===== Quarter-finals =====
4 March 1998 First leg	Juventus (Italy)	1–1	(Ukraine) Dynamo Kyiv	Turin, Italy
20:45 CET (UTC+01:00)	Davids (yellow card) 47'; Montero (yellow card) 64'; Inzaghi 69'	Report	Luzhnyi (yellow card) 40'; Husin 56'; Mykhaylenko (yellow card) 84'	Stadium: Stadio delle Alpi; Attendance: 40,723; Referee: Paul Durkin (England)

18 March 1998 Second leg	Dynamo Kyiv (Ukraine)	1–4 (2–5 agg.)	(Italy) Juventus	Kyiv, Ukraine
20:45 CET (UTC+01:00)	Rebrov 54'; Gerasimenko (yellow card) 61'	Report	Inzaghi 29', 65', 73'; Del Piero 88'	Stadium: Olympic Stadium; Attendance: 120,000; Referee: Marc Batta (France)

===== Semi-finals =====
1 April 1998 First leg	Juventus (Italy)	4–1	(France) Monaco	Turin, Italy
20:45 CEST (UTC+02:00)	Deschamps (yellow card) 31'; Del Piero 35', 45+3' (pen.), 62' (pen.); Zidane 87'	Report	Djetou (yellow card) 34'; Costinha 42', (yellow card) 66'	Stadium: Stadio delle Alpi; Attendance: 60,000; Referee: Nikolai Levnikov (Russia)

15 April 1998 Second leg	Monaco (France)	3–2 (4–6 agg.)	(Italy) Juventus	Monaco
20:45 CEST (UTC+02:00)	Léonard 38'; Henry 50'; Martin (yellow card) 79'; Špehar 83'	Report	Amoruso 15'; Del Piero 74'; Conte (yellow card) 88'	Stadium: Stade Louis II; Attendance: 15,000; Referee: Urs Meier (Switzerland)

===== Final =====
20 May 1998 Final	Juventus (Italy)	0–1	(Spain) Real Madrid	Amsterdam, Netherlands
20:45 CEST (UTC+02:00)	Davids (yellow card) 34'; Montero (yellow card) 79'	Report	Hierro (yellow card) 23'; Roberto Carlos (yellow card) 37'; Karembeu (yellow card) 56'; Mijatović 66'; Seedorf (yellow card) 90+4'	Stadium: Amsterdam Arena; Attendance: 48,500; Referee: Hellmut Krug (Germany)

== Statistics ==
=== Players statistics ===
No.	Pos	Nat	Player	Total		Serie A		Coppa Italia		UEFA Champions League	
No.	Pos	Nat	Player	Apps	Goals	Apps	Goals	Apps	Goals	Apps	Goals
1	GK	(Italy) ITA	Peruzzi	43	-41	31	-25	1	-1	11	-15
15	DF	(Italy) ITA	Birindelli	46	2	26+3	0	7	1	10	1
13	DF	(Italy) ITA	Iuliano	42	1	24+1	1	7	0	10	0
4	DF	(Uruguay) URU	Montero	38	0	24+2	0	5	0	7	0
7	MF	(Italy) ITA	Di Livio	43	0	23+7	0	6	0	7	0
14	MF	(France) FRA	Deschamps	33	0	23+2	0	0	0	8	0
8	MF	(Italy) ITA	Conte	43	5	25+3	4	6	1	9	0
21	MF	(France) FRA	Zidane	47	11	31+1	7	4	1	11	3
26	MF	(Netherlands) NED	Davids	27	1	19+1	1	2	0	5	0
9	FW	(Italy) ITA	Inzaghi	45	25	29+2	18	4	1	10	6
10	FW	(Italy) ITA	Del Piero	46	32	32	21	4	1	10	10
12	GK	(Italy) ITA	Rampulla	13	-8	3+2	-3	7	-5	1	0
3	DF	(Italy) ITA	Torricelli	33	0	18+2	0	6	0	7	0
2	DF	(Italy) ITA	Ferrara	24	1	17	1	2	0	5	0
22	DF	(Italy) ITA	Pessotto	36	0	15+6	0	7	0	8	0
6	DF	(Portugal) POR	Dimas	35	0	12+9	0	6	0	8	0
20	MF	(Italy) ITA	Tacchinardi	41	1	11+12	1	8	0	10	0
5	MF	(Italy) ITA	Pecchia	34	1	5+16	1	8	0	5	0
16	FW	(Italy) ITA	Amoruso	18	6	4+6	2	4	2	4	2
18	FW	(Uruguay) URU	Fonseca	29	8	1+14	4	8	3	6	1
27	FW	(Uruguay) URU	Zalayeta	7	1	0+5	1	2	0	0	0
11	FW	(Italy) ITA	Padovano	3	0	1	0	2	0	0	0
32	FW	(Italy) ITA	Giandomenico	1	0	0	0	1	0	0	0
35	MF	(Italy) ITA	Rigoni	1	0	0	0	1	0	0	0
31	DF	(Italy) ITA	Aronica	1	0	0+1	0	0	0	0	0
25	DF	(Uruguay) URU	Pellegrin	0	0	0	0	0	0	0	0
23	DF	(Italy) ITA	Zamboni	3	0	0+1	0	2	0	0	0
24	MF	(Italy) ITA	Ametrano	1	0	0	0	1	0	0	0
30	DF	(Italy) ITA	Nicoletto	0	0	0	0	0	0	0	0
17	GK	(Italy) ITA	De Sanctis	0	0	0	0	0	0	0	0
33	DF	(Italy) ITA	Zazzetta	0	0	0	0	0	0	0	0
