= 1997–98 FC Bayern Munich season =

98th season in existence of Bayern Munich

FC Bayern Munich
1997–98 season
- Chairman: Franz Beckenbauer
- Manager: Giovanni Trapattoni
- Stadium: Olympiastadion
- Bundesliga: 2nd
- DFB-Ligapokal: Winners
- DFB-Pokal: Winners
- UEFA Champions League: Quarter-finals
- Top goalscorer: League: Carsten Jancker (13); All: Carsten Jancker (23)
- Highest home attendance: 69,000 (vs 1860 Munich, 11 April 1998)
- Lowest home attendance: 12,000 (vs Leverkusen, 17 December 1997)
- Average home league attendance: 48,739
Home colours	Away colours	Special colours

The 1997–98 FC Bayern Munich season was Bayern Munich's 33rd consecutive season in the Bundesliga, the top division of German football. After they won the title in the previous season, Bayern have been only second behind promoted team 1. FC Kaiserslautern. At Olympiastadion Berlin, Bayern beat MSV Duisburg 2–1 in the 1998 DFB-Pokal final, which meant the first DFB-Pokal title since 1986. In the UEFA Champions League Bayern were eliminated in the quarterfinals after extra time by national rival and cup holder Borussia Dortmund.

== Pre-season ==
5 July 1997 Friendly	FC Mindelzell	0–12	Bayern Munich	Mindelzell
			Jancker (4); Zickler (3); Bugera (2); Strunz; Nerlinger; Hamann

6 July 1997 Friendly	Fenerbahçe	0–2	Bayern Munich
			Scholl (2)

9 July 1997 Friendly	Magdeburg	1–2	Bayern Munich	Magdeburg
			Élber; Zickler	Stadium: Ernst Grube Stadium

13 July 1997 Friendly	Eintracht Schwerin	0–4	Bayern Munich	Schwerin
			Jancker (2); Hamann; Scholl	Stadium: Sportpark Paulshöhe

16 July 1997 Friendly	Greifswalder SC	0–4	Bayern Munich	Greifswald
			Helmer (2); Jancker; Unknown (o.g.)	Stadium: Volksstadion

18 July 1997 Friendly	Sachsen Leipzig	1–3	Bayern Munich	Leipzig
	Unknown		Hamann; Élber; Münch	Stadium: Alfred-Kunze-Sportpark

28 July 1997 Opel Master Cup (Semi-final)	Hertha BSC	0–1	Bayern Munich	Berlin
		Report	5' Élber	Stadium: Olympiastadion

28 July 1997 Opel Master Cup (Final)	Milan	0–0 (a.e.t.) (5–3 p)	Bayern Munich	Berlin
		Report		Stadium: Olympiastadion
	Penalties
	Boban (penalty scored); Costacurta (penalty scored); André Cruz (penalty scored); Ziege (penalty scored); Maldini (penalty scored)		(penalty scored) Strunz; (penalty scored) Scholl; (penalty missed) Helmer; (penalty scored) Tarnat

11 August 1997 Coppa San Benedetto del Tronto	Juventus	1–0	Bayern Munich	San Benedetto del Tronto
	Inzaghi 22'	Report		Stadium: Stadio Riviera delle Palme; Attendance: 22,000; Referee: Fiorenzo Treossi

== DFB-Ligapokal ==
23 July 1997 Semi-final	Bayern Munich	2–0	Dortmund	Augsburg
19:00 CEST	Élber 29'; Babbel 75'	Report		Stadium: Rosenaustadion; Attendance: 25,000; Referee: Lutz Wagner

26 July 1997 Final	Bayern Munich	2–0	Stuttgart	Leverkusen
19:30 CEST	Basler 57'; Élber 71'	Report		Stadium: Ulrich-Haberland-Stadion; Attendance: 15,000; Referee: Jürgen Jansen

== Bundesliga ==
=== Match results ===
2 August 1997 1	Bayern Munich	0–1	Kaiserslautern	Munich
15:30 CEST		Report	80' Schjønberg	Stadium: Olympiastadion; Attendance: 63,000 (sell-out); Referee: Lutz Fröhlich (Berlin)

6 August 1997 2	Mönchengladbach	1–1	Bayern Munich	Mönchengladbach
20:00 CEST	Pettersson 17'	Report	55' Strunz	Stadium: Bökelbergstadion; Attendance: 34,500 (sell-out); Referee: Hartmut Strampe (Handorf)

9 August 1997 3	Bayern Munich	5–2	Wolfsburg	Munich
15:30 CEST	Élber 10', 58'; Strunz 12'; Rizzitelli 20', 70'	Report	40' Reyna; 86' Meissner	Stadium: Olympiastadion; Attendance: 57,000; Referee: Georg Dardenne (Nettersheim)

24 August 1997 4	Hamburg	0–2	Bayern Munich	Hamburg
18:00 CEST		Report	23' Basler; 82' Zickler	Stadium: Volksparkstadion; Attendance: 48,449; Referee: Jürgen Jansen (Essen)

30 August 1997 5	Hansa Rostock	1–3	Bayern Munich	Rostock
15:30 CEST	Pamić 85'	Report	58' Scholl; 69' Nerlinger; 87' Jancker	Stadium: Ostseestadion; Attendance: 24,800 (sell-out); Referee: Bernhard Zerr (Ottersweier)

13 September 1997 6	Bayern Munich	3–0	Hertha BSC	Munich
15:30 CEST	Élber 42'; Jancker 73'; Strunz 77'	Report		Stadium: Olympiastadion; Attendance: 63,000 (sell-out); Referee: Hans-Jürgen Weber (Essen)

20 September 1997 7	Köln	1–3	Bayern Munich	Cologne
15:30 CEST	Tretschok 34'	Report	14' Jancker; 21' Nerlinger; 90' Scholl	Stadium: Müngersdorfer Stadion; Attendance: 47,000; Referee: Herbert Fandel (Kyllburg)

26 September 1997 8	Bayern Munich	1–1	Schalke	Munich
20:00 CEST	Tarnat 50'	Report	26' Wilmots	Stadium: Olympiastadion; Attendance: 63,000 (sell-out); Referee: Edgar Steinborn (Sinzig)

4 October 1997 9	Bochum	2–3	Bayern Munich	Bochum
15:30 CEST	Gülünoğlu 17'; Yuran 64'	Report	24', 35' Basler; 56' Zickler	Stadium: Ruhrstadion; Attendance: 31,222 (sell-out); Referee: Alfons Berg (Konz)

15 October 1997 10	Bayern Munich	3–3	Stuttgart	Munich
20:00 CEST	Jancker 13'; Hamann 60'; Kuffour 84'	Report	15' Tarnat (o.g.); 62' Berthold; 68' Akpoborie	Stadium: Olympiastadion; Attendance: 62,000; Referee: Bernd Heynemann (Magdeburg)

18 October 1997 11	Karlsruhe	1–1	Bayern Munich	Karlsruhe
15:30 CEST	Schroth 40'	Report	78' Tarnat	Stadium: Wildparkstadion; Attendance: 33,500 (sell-out); Referee: Georg Dardenne (Nettersheim)

25 October 1997 12	Bayern Munich	2–0	Bremen	Munich
15:30 CEST	Jancker 33'; Basler 70'	Report		Stadium: Olympiastadion; Attendance: 63,000 (sell-out); Referee: Jörg Keßler (Höhenkirchen-Siegertsbrunn)

1 November 1997 13	1860 Munich	2–2	Bayern Munich	Munich
17:30 CET	Heldt 9'; Winkler 52'	Report	35' Hamann; 54' Basler	Stadium: Olympiastadion; Attendance: 69,900 (sell-out); Referee: Hellmut Krug (Gelsenkirchen)

8 November 1997 14	Bayern Munich	1–0	Bielefeld	Munich
15:30 CET	Élber 24'	Report		Stadium: Olympiastadion; Attendance: 47,000; Referee: Uwe Kemmling (Kleinburgwedel)

11 November 1997 17	Dortmund	0–2	Bayern Munich	Dortmund
20:00 CET		Report	36' Jancker; 40' Élber	Stadium: Westfalenstadion; Attendance: 55,500 (sell-out); Referee: Hartmut Strampe (Handorf)

19 November 1997 15	Leverkusen	v	Bayern Munich	Leverkusen
--:-- CET				Stadium: Ulrich-Haberland-Stadion

22 November 1997 16	Bayern Munich	3–0	Duisburg	Munich
15:30 CET	Helmer 10'; Rizzitelli 37'; Mehmet Scholl 72'	Report		Stadium: Olympiastadion; Attendance: 40,000; Referee: Torsten Koop (Lüttenmark)

30 November 1997 15	Leverkusen	4–2	Bayern Munich	Leverkusen
19:45 CET	Heintze 45'; Kirsten 69', 90', 90'	Report	6' Élber; 24' Jancker	Stadium: Ulrich-Haberland-Stadion; Attendance: 22,500 (sell-out); Referee: Bernd Heynemann (Magdeburg)

5 December 1997 18	Kaiserslautern	2–0	Bayern Munich	Kaiserslautern
20:00 CET	Hamann (o.g.) 44'; Hristov 85'	Report		Stadium: Fritz-Walter-Stadion; Attendance: 38,000 (sell-out); Referee: Lutz Michael Fröhlich (Berlin)

13 December 1997 19	Bayern Munich	3–2	Mönchengladbach	Munich
15:30 CET	Jancker 20', 50'; Nerlinger 52'	Report	63' Effenberg; 87' Pettersson	Stadium: Olympiastadion; Attendance: 46,000; Referee: Herbert Fandel (Kyllburg)

20 December 1997 20	Wolfsburg	2–3	Bayern Munich	Wolfsburg
15:30 CET	Reyna 45'; Dammeier 47'	Report	5' Scholl; 26' Jancker; 79' Kuffour	Stadium: VfL-Stadion; Attendance: 21,600 (sell-out); Referee: Jürgen Aust (Köln)

31 January 1998 21	Bayern Munich	3–0	Hamburg	Munich
15:30 CET	Élber 1', 41'; Jancker 56'	Report		Stadium: Olympiastadion; Attendance: 44,000; Referee: Hans-Jürgen Weber (Essen)

7 February 1998 22	Bayern Munich	2–0	Hansa Rostock	Munich
15:30 CET	Zickler 16'; Tarnat 18'	Report		Stadium: Olympiastadion; Attendance: 36,000; Referee: Jörg Keßler (Höhenkirchen-Siegertsbrunn)

14 February 1998 23	Hertha BSC	2–1	Bayern Munich	Berlin
15:30 CET	Preetz 18'; Čović 70'	Report	84' Preetz (o.g.)	Stadium: Olympiastadion; Attendance: 76,000 (sell-out); Referee: Alfons Berg (Konz)

28 February 1998 24	Bayern Munich	0–2	Köln	Munich
15:30 CET		Report	49' Münch; 63' Azizi	Stadium: Olympiastadion; Attendance: 45,000; Referee: Hartmut Strampe (Handorf)

8 March 1998 25	Schalke	1–0	Bayern Munich	Gelsenkirchen
19:45 CET	Linke 19'	Report		Stadium: Parkstadion; Attendance: 71,017 (sell-out); Referee: Jürgen Aust (Köln)

14 March 1998 26	Bayern Munich	0–0	Bochum	Munich
15:30 CET		Report		Stadium: Olympiastadion; Attendance: 49,000; Referee: Torsten Koop (Lüttenmark)

22 March 1998 27	Stuttgart	0–3	Bayern Munich	Stuttgart
19:45 CET		Report	21' Fink; 40' Scholl; 78' Zickler	Stadium: Gottlieb-Daimler-Stadion; Attendance: 53,000 (sell-out); Referee: Alfons Berg (Konz)

28 March 1998 28	Bayern Munich	1–1	Karlsruhe	Munich
15:30 CET	Élber 75'	Report	45' Régis	Stadium: Olympiastadion; Attendance: 63,000 (sell-out); Referee: Lutz Wagner (Kriftel)

4 April 1998 29	Bremen	0–3	Bayern Munich	Bremen
15:30 CEST		Report	9', 61' Scholl; 81' Jancker	Stadium: Weserstadion; Attendance: 35,883 (sell-out); Referee: Georg Dardenne (Nettersheim)

11 April 1998 30	Bayern Munich	3–1	1860 Munich	Munich
15:30 CEST	Scholl 39'; Jancker 43'; Matthäus 47'	Report	73' Ouakili	Stadium: Olympiastadion; Attendance: 69,000 (sell-out); Referee: Bernd Heynemann (Magdeburg)

18 April 1998 31	Bielefeld	4–4	Bayern Munich	Bielefeld
15:30 CEST	Maas 2'; Sternkopf 40'; Scholl (o.g.) 74'; Kuffour (o.g.) 82'	Report	27' Tarnat; 34' Babbel; 34' Nerlinger; 89' Matthäus	Stadium: Bielefelder Alm; Attendance: 22,512 (sell-out); Referee: Bernhard Zerr (Ottersweier)

26 April 1998 32	Bayern Munich	2–1	Leverkusen	Munich
19:45 CEST	Tarnat 16'; Rizzitelli 49'	Report	83' Rink	Stadium: Olympiastadion; Attendance: 54,000; Referee: Edgar Steinborn (Sinzig)

2 May 1998 33	Duisburg	0–0	Bayern Munich	Duisburg
15:30 CEST		Report		Stadium: Wedaustadion; Attendance: 30,128 (sell-out); Referee: Bernd Heynemann (Magedeburg)

9 May 1998 34	Bayern Munich	4–0	Dortmund	Munich
15:30 CEST	Scholl 47'; Matthäus 48'; Élber 83', 90'	Report		Stadium: Olympiastadion; Attendance: 63,000 (sell-out); Referee: Jörg Keßler (Höhenkirchen-Siegertsbrunn)

=== Classification ===
Pos	Team	Pld	W	D	L	GF	GA	GD	Pts	Qualification or relegation
1	1. FC Kaiserslautern (C)	34	19	11	4	63	39	+24	68	Qualification to Champions League group stage
2	Bayern Munich	34	19	9	6	69	37	+32	66	Qualification to Champions League second qualifying round
3	Bayer Leverkusen	34	14	13	7	66	39	+27	55	Qualification to UEFA Cup first round
4	VfB Stuttgart	34	14	10	10	55	49	+6	52	Qualification to UEFA Cup first round
5	Schalke 04	34	13	13	8	38	32	+6	52	Qualification to UEFA Cup first round

Source: www.dfb.de
Rules for classification: 1) points; 2) goal difference; 3) number of goals scored.
(C) Champions

==== Results summary ====
Overall								Home						Away					
Pld	W	D	L	GF	GA	GD	Pts	W	D	L	GF	GA	GD	W	D	L	GF	GA	GD
34	19	9	6	69	37	+32	66	11	4	2	36	14	+22	8	5	4	33	23	+10

Source: Competitive Matches

==== Results by round ====
Round	1	2	3	4	5	6	7	8	9	10	11	12	13	14	15	16	17	18	19	20	21	22	23	24	25	26	27	28	29	30	31	32	33	34
Ground	H	A	H	A	A	H	A	H	A	H	A	H	A	H	A	H	A	A	H	A	H	H	A	H	A	H	A	H	A	H	A	H	A	H
Result	L	D	W	W	W	W	W	D	W	D	D	W	D	W	W	W	L	L	W	W	W	W	L	L	L	D	W	D	W	W	D	W	D	W
Position	15	16	4	3	2	2	2	2	2	2	2	2	2	2	2	2	2	2	2	2	2	2	2	2	2	2	2	2	2	2	2	2	2	2

Source: Competitions
A = Away; H = Home; W = Win; D = Draw; L = Loss

== DFB-Pokal ==
15 August 1997 1st Round	Waldberg	1–16	Bayern Munich	Nuremberg
18:00 CEST	Haase 16'	Report	12', 18', 22' Élber; 13' Scholl; 32', 36', 43', 45', 47' Jancker; 37' Basler; 39', 50' Hamann; 55' Fink; 57' Strunz; 60' Helmer; 74' Rizzitelli	Stadium: Frankenstadion; Attendance: 35,500; Referee: Volker Wezel (Tübingen)

23 September 1997 2nd Round	Wolfsburg	3–3 (a.e.t.) (3–4 p)	Bayern Munich	Wolfsburg
20:30 CEST	Reyna 7'; Kovačević 44'; Präger 88'	Report	45' Élber; 77' Zickler; 85' Tarnat	Stadium: VfL-Stadion; Attendance: 15,500 (sell-out); Referee: Hellmut Krug (Gelsenkirchen)
	Penalties
	Dammeier (penalty scored); Spies (penalty scored); Reyna (penalty missed); Präger (penalty missed); Tyszkiewicz (penalty scored)		(penalty missed) Strunz; (penalty scored) Scholl; (penalty scored) Nerlinger; (penalty scored) Lizarazu; (penalty scored) Tarnat

28 October 1997 Round of 16	Kaiserslautern	1–2	Bayern Munich	Kaiserslautern
20:30 CEST	Sforza 25'	Report	3' Nerlinger; 75' Jancker	Stadium: Fritz-Walter-Stadion; Attendance: 38,000 (sell-out); Referee: Jürgen Jansen (Essen)

17 December 1997 Quarter-final	Bayern Munich	2–0	Leverkusen	Munich
19:45 CET	Nerlinger 42'; Élber 74'	Report		Stadium: Olympiastadion; Attendance: 12,000; Referee: Edgar Steinborn (Sinzig)

17 February 1998 Semi-final	Bayern Munich	3–0	Stuttgart	Munich
20:15 CET	Hamann 14'; Scholl 21'; Tarnat 25'	Report		Stadium: Olympiastadion; Attendance: 32,000; Referee: Herbert Fandel (Kyllburg)

16 May 1998 Final	Bayern Munich	2–1	Duisburg	Berlin
19:30 CEST	Babbel 70'; Basler 89'	Report	20' Salou	Stadium: Olympiastadion; Attendance: 75,841 (sell-out); Referee: Hartmut Strampe (Handorf)

== Champions League ==
Bayern Munich qualified for the group stage of the 1997–98 UEFA Champions League by finishing first in the Bundesliga in 1996–97.

=== Group stage ===
Pos	Team	Pld	W	D	L	GF	GA	GD	Pts	Qualification	BAY	PAR	BES	GOT
1	(Germany) Bayern Munich	6	4	0	2	13	6	+7	12	Advance to knockout stage	—	5–1	2–0	0–1
2	(France) Paris Saint-Germain	6	4	0	2	11	10	+1	12		3–1	—	2–1	3–0
3	(Turkey) Beşiktaş	6	2	0	4	6	9	−3	6		0–2	3–1	—	1–0
4	(Sweden) IFK Göteborg	6	2	0	4	4	9	−5	6		1–3	0–1	2–1	—

Source: UEFA

17 September 1997 1	Bayern Munich (Germany)	2–0	(Turkey) Beşiktaş	Munich
20:45 CEST	Helmer 3'; Basler 70'	Report		Stadium: Olympiastadion; Attendance: 38,000; Referee: Kim Milton Nielsen (Denmark)

1 October 1997 2	IFK Göteborg (Sweden)	1–3	(Germany) Bayern Munich	Gothenburg
20:45 CEST	Lučić 85'	Report	2' Jancker; 35' Hamann; 90' Élber	Stadium: Ullevi; Attendance: 26,503; Referee: Mario van der Ende (Netherlands)

22 October 1997 3	Bayern Munich (Germany)	5–1	(France) PSG	Munich
20:45 CEST	Élber 4', 73'; Jancker 20', 47'; Helmer 50'	Report	48' Simone	Stadium: Olympiastadion; Attendance: 45,000; Referee: Manuel Díaz Vega (Spain)

5 November 1997 4	PSG (France)	3–1	(Germany) Bayern Munich	Paris
20:45 CET	Gava 18'; Tarnat (o.g.) 72'; Leroy 75'	Report	29' Babbel	Stadium: Parc des Princes; Attendance: 32,274; Referee: Piero Ceccarini (Italy)

26 November 1997 5	Beşiktaş (Turkey)	0–2	(Germany) Bayern Munich	Istanbul
21:45 EET		Report	5' Jancker; 31' Helmer	Stadium: BJK İnönü Stadium; Attendance: 26,000 (sell-out); Referee: Urs Meier (Switzerland)

10 December 1997 6	Bayern Munich (Germany)	0–1	(Sweden) IFK Göteborg	Munich
20:45 CET		Report	51' Babbel (o.g.)	Stadium: Olympiastadion; Attendance: 27,000; Referee: Stefano Braschi (Italy)

=== Knockout stage ===
==== Quarter-finals ====
4 March 1998 1st leg	Bayern Munich (Germany)	0–0	(Germany) Dortmund	Munich
20:45 CET		Report		Stadium: Olympiastadion; Attendance: 60,000; Referee: Pierluigi Collina (Italy)

18 March 1998 2nd leg	Dortmund (Germany)	1–0 (a.e.t.) (1–0 agg.)	(Germany) Bayern Munich	Dortmund
20:45 CET	Chapuisat 109'	Report		Stadium: Westfalenstadion; Attendance: 48,500 (sell-out); Referee: László Vágner (Hungary)

== Player statistics ==
Numbers in parentheses denote appearances as substitute.

No.	Pos.	Nat.	Name	Bundesliga		DFB-Pokal		DFB-Ligapokal		UEFA CL		Total	
No.	Pos.	Nat.	Name	Apps	Goals	Apps	Goals	Apps	Goals	Apps	Goals	Apps	Goals
Goalkeepers
1	GK	GER	Oliver Kahn	34	0	6	0	2	0	8	0	50	0
12	GK	GER	Sven Scheuer	0	0	0	0	0	0	0	0	0	0
22	GK	GER	Bernd Dreher	0	0	0	0	0	0	0	0	0	0
Defenders
2	DF	GER	Markus Babbel	27 (3)	1	6	1	2	1	7 (1)	1	42 (4)	4
3	DF	GER	Markus Münch	0	0	0	0	0	0	0	0	0	0
4	DF	GHA	Samuel Kuffour	15 (2)	2	3	0	0	0	5	0	23 (2)	2
5	DF	GER	Thomas Helmer	28	1	5	1	2	0	7	3	42	5
10	DF	GER	Lothar Matthäus	25	3	3	0	2	0	5	0	35	3
11	DF	FRA	Bixente Lizarazu	11 (8)	0	2 (1)	0	1 (1)	0	0 (2)	0	14 (12)	0
15	DF	GER	Dennis Grassow	0	0	0 (1)	0	0	0	0	0	0 (1)	0
18	DF	GER	Michael Tarnat	28 (4)	5	5	2	2	0	8	0	43 (4)	7
28	DF	GER	Frank Wiblishauser	0	0	0	0	0	0	0	0	0	0
29	DF	GHA	Christian Saba	0	0	0	0	0	0	0	0	0	0
30	DF	GER	Alexander Bugera	0 (1)	0	0	0	0	0	0	0	0 (1)	0
33	DF	GER	Markus Weinzierl	0	0	0	0	0	0	0	0	0	0
Midfielders
6	MF	GER	Christian Nerlinger	31 (2)	4	4 (1)	2	1 (1)	0	6 (1)	0	42 (5)	6
7	MF	GER	Mehmet Scholl	25 (7)	9	6	2	1 (1)	0	8	0	40 (8)	11
8	MF	GER	Thomas Strunz	7 (9)	3	2 (2)	1	2	0	2 (2)	0	13 (13)	4
14	MF	GER	Mario Basler	19 (3)	5	5	2	1	1	3 (2)	1	28 (5)	9
16	MF	GER	Dietmar Hamann	25 (3)	2	5	3	2	0	8	1	40 (3)	6
17	MF	GER	Thorsten Fink	24 (9)	1	2 (4)	1	1 (1)	0	4 (4)	0	31 (18)	2
23	MF	GER	Frank Gerster	0 (5)	0	0	0	0	0	0 (1)	0	0 (6)	0
24	MF	GER	Stefan Leitl	0	0	0	0	0	0	0	0	0	0
31	MF	CZE	David Jarolím	0	0	0	0	0	0	0	0	0	0
32	MF	GHA	Emanuel Bentil	0	0	0	0	0	0	0	0	0	0
Forwards
9	FW	BRA	Giovane Élber	27 (1)	11	6	5	2	2	7 (1)	3	42 (2)	21
19	FW	GER	Carsten Jancker	25 (4)	13	5 (1)	6	0 (1)	0	7 (1)	4	37 (7)	23
20	FW	ITA	Ruggiero Rizzitelli	12 (8)	4	0 (2)	1	1	0	2 (2)	0	15 (12)	5
21	FW	GER	Alexander Zickler	11 (18)	4	1 (2)	1	0	0	1 (4)	0	13 (24)	5
