= 1997 in Norwegian football =

Football in Norway
- Season: 1997

Men's football
- Tippeligaen: Rosenborg
- 1. divisjon: Vålerenga
- 2. divisjon: Kjelsås (Group 1); Raufoss (Group 2); Ullern (Group 3); Vidar (Group 4); Fana (Group 5); Kolstad (Group 6); Strindheim (Group 7); Lofoten (Group 8)
- Cupen: Vålerenga

Women's football
- Toppserien: Trondheims-Ørn
- Cupen: Trondheims-Ørn

The 1997 season was the 69th season of competitive football in Norway.

== Men's football ==
=== League season ===
==== Promotion and relegation ====
League	Promoted to league	Relegated from league
Tippeligaen	Lyn; Haugesund; Sogndal	Moss; Start; Vålerenga
1. divisjon	Runar; Sarpsborg	Jevnaker; Tromsdalen; Ullern; Elverum; Stålkameratene; Mjøndalen; Fana; Strindheim; Nardo; Vidar; Åsane; Fyllingen

==== Tippeligaen ====
Pos	Team	Pld	W	D	L	GF	GA	GD	Pts	Qualification or relegation
1	Rosenborg (C)	26	18	7	1	87	20	+67	61	Qualification for the Champions League second qualifying round
2	Brann	26	15	5	6	59	37	+22	50	Qualification for the UEFA Cup second qualifying round
3	Strømsgodset	26	14	4	8	58	44	+14	46	Qualification for the UEFA Cup second qualifying round
4	Molde	26	13	6	7	47	36	+11	45	Qualification for the UEFA Cup second qualifying round
5	Stabæk	26	13	4	9	33	35	−2	43	Qualification for the Intertoto Cup first round
6	Kongsvinger	26	11	5	10	43	48	−5	38	Qualification for the Intertoto Cup first round
7	Bodø/Glimt	26	10	7	9	39	34	+5	37	
8	Viking	26	8	10	8	42	34	+8	34	
9	Haugesund	26	9	5	12	31	38	−7	32	
10	Lillestrøm	26	9	5	12	34	43	−9	32	
11	Sogndal	26	8	5	13	34	56	−22	29	
12	Tromsø (O)	26	6	10	10	37	44	−7	28	Qualification for the relegation play-offs
13	Lyn (R)	26	4	5	17	28	58	−30	17	Relegation to First Division
14	Skeid (R)	26	3	4	19	27	72	−45	13	Relegation to First Division

Source: fotball.no
Rules for classification: 1) points; 2) goal difference; 3) number of goals scored.
(C) Champions; (O) Play-off winners; (R) Relegated

Vålerenga Fotball qualified for the Cup Winners' Cup as Norwegian Cup winners from a lower division.

==== 1. divisjon ====
Pos	Team	Pld	W	D	L	GF	GA	GD	Pts	Promotion, qualification or relegation
1	Vålerenga (C, P)	26	19	3	4	70	21	+49	60	Promotion to Tippeligaen
2	Moss (P)	26	19	2	5	52	27	+25	59	Promotion to Tippeligaen
3	Eik-Tønsberg	26	11	7	8	43	34	+9	40	Qualification for the promotion play-offs
4	Start	26	11	7	8	41	44	−3	40	
5	Odd Grenland	26	11	6	9	39	36	+3	39	
6	Byåsen	26	11	4	11	42	36	+6	37	
7	Hødd	26	11	3	12	35	40	−5	36	
8	HamKam	26	9	8	9	40	34	+6	35	
9	Bryne	26	10	5	11	46	42	+4	35	
10	Aalesund	26	11	2	13	36	36	0	35	
11	Runar (R)	26	10	4	12	35	45	−10	34	Relegation to Second Division
12	Drøbak/Frogn (R)	26	6	6	14	21	47	−26	24	Relegation to Second Division
13	Harstad (R)	26	4	8	14	21	52	−31	20	Relegation to Second Division
14	Sarpsborg (R)	26	5	3	18	19	46	−27	18	Relegation to Second Division

Source: nifs.no
Rules for classification: 1) points; 2) goal difference; 3) number of goals scored.
(C) Champions; (P) Promoted; (R) Relegated

==== 2. divisjon ====
===== Group 1 =====
Pos	Team	Pld	W	D	L	GF	GA	GD	Pts	Promotion or relegation
1	Kjelsås (P)	22	13	6	3	41	17	+24	45	Promotion to First Division
2	Skjetten	22	12	6	4	40	22	+18	42	
3	Lillestrøm 2	22	12	5	5	76	30	+46	41	
4	Fredrikstad	22	10	8	4	41	21	+20	38	
5	Ski	22	10	5	7	58	37	+21	35	
6	Østsiden	22	10	2	10	46	34	+12	32	
7	Råde	22	9	3	10	47	48	−1	30	
8	Strømmen	22	8	4	10	36	40	−4	28	
9	Sprint-Jeløy	22	8	4	10	40	60	−20	28	
10	Lørenskog (Note: Lørenskog survived as the best tenth-place team, since Stålkameratene was removed.)	22	8	2	12	34	50	−16	26	
11	Frigg (R)	22	5	5	12	26	64	−38	20	Relegation to Third Division
12	Selbak (R)	22	0	4	18	14	78	−64	4	Relegation to Third Division

(P) Promoted; (R) Relegated

===== Group 2 =====
Pos	Team	Pld	W	D	L	GF	GA	GD	Pts	Promotion or relegation
1	Raufoss (P)	22	13	6	3	53	27	+26	45	Promotion to First Division
2	Faaberg	22	13	2	7	54	27	+27	41	
3	Grei	22	11	4	7	42	35	+7	37	
4	Liv/Fossekallen	22	10	5	7	43	23	+20	35	
5	Årvoll	22	10	5	7	43	36	+7	35	
6	Elverum	22	10	3	9	48	50	−2	33	
7	Jevnaker	22	8	6	8	37	35	+2	30	
8	Gjøvik-Lyn	22	7	8	7	40	39	+1	29	
9	Ham-Kam 2	22	8	4	10	26	44	−18	28	
10	Eidsvold Turn (R)	22	6	4	12	31	42	−11	22	Relegation to Third Division
11	Mercantile (R)	22	5	6	11	26	50	−24	21	Relegation to Third Division
12	Holter (R)	22	4	1	17	23	58	−35	13	Relegation to Third Division

(P) Promoted; (R) Relegated

===== Group 3 =====
Pos	Team	Pld	W	D	L	GF	GA	GD	Pts	Promotion or relegation
1	Ullern (P)	22	14	5	3	41	17	+24	47	Promotion to First Division
2	Bærum	22	13	5	4	52	30	+22	44	
3	Sandefjord	22	14	1	7	43	30	+13	43	
4	Ørn-Horten	22	12	3	7	56	37	+19	39	
5	Jerv	22	11	6	5	44	26	+18	39	
6	Larvik Turn	22	11	5	6	45	34	+11	38	
7	Pors Grenland	22	11	5	6	38	29	+9	38	
8	Mjøndalen	22	7	5	10	35	32	+3	26	
9	Åssiden	22	5	3	14	30	43	−13	18	
10	Falk (R)	22	4	6	12	22	43	−21	18	Relegation to Third Division
11	Vindbjart (R)	22	4	2	16	15	59	−44	14	Relegation to Third Division
12	Stokke (R)	22	3	0	19	21	62	−41	9	Relegation to Third Division

(P) Promoted; (R) Relegated

===== Group 4 =====
Pos	Team	Pld	W	D	L	GF	GA	GD	Pts	Relegation
1	Vidar	22	16	2	4	60	19	+41	50	
2	Fyllingen	22	15	1	6	64	30	+34	46	
3	Vard Haugesund	22	13	4	5	50	30	+20	43	
4	Randaberg	22	10	4	8	35	32	+3	34	
5	Flekkefjord	22	9	2	11	39	42	−3	29	
6	Eiger	22	8	5	9	26	31	−5	29	
7	Sola	22	8	4	10	39	45	−6	28 (Note: It seems unlikely that Vedavåg and Sola would have an identical record (including goals) but this is how it is printed in the source.)	
8	Vedavåg	22	8	4	10	39	45	−6	28	
9	Ålgård	22	7	6	9	28	31	−3	27	
10	Vigør (R)	22	5	7	10	32	48	−16	22	Relegation to Third Division
11	Viking 2 (R)	22	7	1	14	24	53	−29	22	Relegation to Third Division
12	Kopervik (R)	22	4	4	14	27	53	−26	16	Relegation to Third Division

(R) Relegated

===== Group 5 =====
Pos	Team	Pld	W	D	L	GF	GA	GD	Pts	Relegation
1	Fana	22	18	3	1	56	18	+38	57	
2	Åsane	22	15	3	4	46	21	+25	48	
3	Brann 2	22	10	5	7	47	28	+19	35	
4	Nest-Sotra	22	11	1	10	48	42	+6	34	
5	Volda	22	7	10	5	27	26	+1	31	
6	Stryn	22	8	5	9	37	38	−1	29	
7	Førde	22	8	5	9	32	35	−3	29	
8	Stord	22	6	7	9	28	42	−14	25	
9	Skarbøvik	22	7	3	12	27	44	−17	24	
10	Løv-Ham (R)	22	6	3	13	35	44	−9	21	Relegation to Third Division
11	Trott (R)	22	5	4	13	26	47	−21	19	Relegation to Third Division
12	Ørsta (R)	22	6	1	15	29	53	−24	19	Relegation to Third Division

(R) Relegated

===== Group 6 =====
Pos	Team	Pld	W	D	L	GF	GA	GD	Pts	Relegation
1	Kolstad	22	13	6	3	42	20	+22	45	
2	Nardo	22	11	6	5	40	23	+17	39	
3	Ranheim	22	12	3	7	37	26	+11	39	
4	Abildsø	22	11	4	7	40	34	+6	37	
5	Molde 2	22	9	4	9	45	37	+8	31	
6	Træff	22	8	7	7	46	39	+7	31	
7	Averøykameratene	22	8	7	7	33	33	0	31	
8	Nationalkam	22	7	8	7	42	49	−7	29	
9	Fossum	22	7	5	10	35	40	−5	26	
10	Åndalsnes (Note: Åndalsnes survived as the second best tenth-place team, since Narvik/Nor was disestablished.)	22	6	7	9	28	30	−2	25	
11	Orkanger (R)	22	4	5	13	31	52	−21	17	Relegation to Third Division
12	Nidelv (R)	22	4	2	16	22	58	−36	14	Relegation to Third Division

(R) Relegated

===== Group 7 =====
Pos	Team	Pld	W	D	L	GF	GA	GD	Pts	Promotion or relegation
1	Strindheim (P)	22	17	0	5	80	29	+51	51	Promotion to First Division
2	Rosenborg 2	22	15	1	6	79	28	+51	46	
3	Verdal	22	14	0	8	44	31	+13	42	
4	Mosjøen	22	12	5	5	50	32	+18	41	
5	Stålkameratene (Note: Stålkameratene was forcibly relegated for cheating by using ineligible players.) (R)	22	13	1	8	56	39	+17	40	Relegation to Third Division
6	Gevir Bodø	22	9	6	7	68	38	+30	33	
7	Steinkjer	22	10	3	9	42	46	−4	33	
8	Stjørdals-Blink	22	9	5	8	47	52	−5	32	
9	Mo	22	9	1	12	55	46	+9	28	
10	Namsos (R)	22	5	4	13	43	70	−27	19	Relegation to Third Division
11	Sandnessjøen (R)	22	2	2	18	33	113	−80	8	Relegation to Third Division
12	Fauske/Sprint (R)	22	1	4	17	25	98	−73	7	Relegation to Third Division

(P) Promoted; (R) Relegated

===== Group 8 =====
Pos	Team	Pld	W	D	L	GF	GA	GD	Pts	Relegation
1	Lofoten	22	17	3	2	66	25	+41	54	
2	Tromsdalen	22	14	4	4	69	28	+41	46	
3	Finnsnes	22	13	1	8	62	34	+28	40	
4	Skjervøy	22	12	4	6	54	35	+19	40	
5	Alta	22	11	4	7	66	44	+22	37	
6	Mjølner-Narvik	22	11	2	9	65	39	+26	35	
7	Narvik/Nor (R)	22	10	4	8	48	52	−4	34	Merged (Note: Narvik/Nor ceased to exist after the season because of a merger.)
8	Silsand/Omegn	22	9	5	8	46	38	+8	32	
9	Polarstjernen	22	7	5	10	40	71	−31	26	
10	Sortland (R)	22	5	1	16	35	56	−21	16	Relegation to Third Division
11	Porsanger (R)	22	2	4	16	26	63	−37	10	Relegation to Third Division
12	Tromsø 2 (R)	22	1	3	18	28	120	−92	6	Relegation to Third Division

(R) Relegated

=== Norwegian Cup ===
==== Final ====
26 October 1997
13:15 CET (UTC+1)

Vålerenga	4–2	Strømsgodset
Kaasa 4'; Haug 51'; Musæus 63'; Levernes 65'	Report	Tanasić 53', 56'

Ullevaal Stadion, Oslo
Attendance: 22,678
Referee: Roy Helge Olsen (Harstad)

== Women's football ==
=== League season ===
==== Toppserien ====
Pos	Team	Pld	W	D	L	GF	GA	GD	Pts	Relegation
1	Trondheims-Ørn (C)	18	16	1	1	81	26	+55	49	
2	Asker	18	11	4	3	48	23	+25	37	
3	Klepp	18	10	3	5	33	23	+10	33	
4	Kolbotn	18	9	5	4	46	21	+25	32	
5	Sandviken	18	7	5	6	34	26	+8	26	
6	Bjørnar	18	7	5	6	30	25	+5	26	
7	Setskog/Høland	18	7	2	9	39	36	+3	23	
8	Athene Moss	18	6	1	11	33	38	−5	19	
9	Bøler (R)	18	2	2	14	15	78	−63	8	Relegation to First Division
10	Verdal (R)	18	1	0	17	25	88	−63	3	Relegation to First Division

(C) Champions; (R) Relegated

=== Norwegian Women's Cup ===
==== Final ====
- Trondheims-Ørn 6–1 Klepp

== UEFA competitions ==
=== UEFA Champions League ===
==== Qualifying rounds ====
===== Second qualifying round =====
Team 1	Agg.	Team 2	1st leg	2nd leg
MTK Hungária (Hungary)	1–4	(Norway) Rosenborg	0–1	1–3

==== Group stage ====
===== Group D =====
Pos	Team	Pld	W	D	L	GF	GA	GD	Pts	Qualification	RMA	ROS	OLY	POR
1	(Spain) Real Madrid	6	4	1	1	15	4	+11	13	Advance to knockout stage	—	4–1	5–1	4–0
2	(Norway) Rosenborg	6	3	2	1	13	8	+5	11		2–0	—	5–1	2–0
3	(Greece) Olympiacos	6	1	2	3	6	14	−8	5		0–0	2–2	—	1–0
4	(Portugal) Porto	6	1	1	4	3	11	−8	4		0–2	1–1	2–1	—

Source: UEFA

=== UEFA Cup Winners' Cup ===
==== First round ====
Team 1	Agg.	Team 2	1st leg	2nd leg
Zagreb (Croatia)	5–6	(Norway) Tromsø	3–2	2–4 (aet)

==== Second round ====
Team 1	Agg.	Team 2	1st leg	2nd leg
Tromsø (Norway)	4–9	(England) Chelsea	3–2	1–7

=== UEFA Cup ===
==== Qualifying round ====
===== First qualifying round =====
Team 1	Agg.	Team 2	1st leg	2nd leg
Vojvodina (Federal Republic of Yugoslavia)	2–2 (4–5 p)	(Norway) Viking	0–2	2–0(aet)
Brann (Norway)	4–4 (a)	(Bulgaria) Naftex Burgas	2–1	2–3

===== Second qualifying round =====
Team 1	Agg.	Team 2	1st leg	2nd leg
Neuchâtel Xamax (Switzerland)	4–2	(Norway) Viking	3–0	1–2
Grasshoppers (Switzerland)	3–2	(Norway) Brann	3–0	0–2
Dinamo Minsk (Belarus)	0–3	(Norway) Lillestrøm	0–2	0–1

==== First round ====
Team 1	Agg.	Team 2	1st leg	2nd leg
Twente (Netherlands)	2–2(a)	(Norway) Lillestrøm	0–1	2–1

=== Intertoto Cup ===
==== Group stage ====
===== Group 5 =====
Pos	Team	Pld	W	D	L	GF	GA	GD	Pts
1	(Russia) Dinamo Moscow	4	3	1	0	7	4	+3	10
2	(Belgium) Genk	4	3	0	1	15	8	+7	9
3	(Norway) Stabæk	4	1	2	1	10	6	+4	5
4	(Greece) Panachaiki	4	1	1	2	8	9	−1	4
5	(Faroe Islands) B36 Tórshavn	4	0	0	4	2	15	−13	0

===== Group 8 =====
Pos	Team	Pld	W	D	L	GF	GA	GD	Pts
1	(Sweden) Halmstad	4	3	1	0	10	3	+7	10
2	(Belgium) Lommel	4	1	3	0	6	5	+1	6
3	(Federal Republic of Yugoslavia) Hajduk Kula	4	2	0	2	6	5	+1	6
4	(Finland) TPS	4	1	1	2	5	9	−4	4
5	(Norway) Kongsvinger	4	0	1	3	2	7	−5	1

== National teams ==
=== Norway men's national football team ===
==== Results ====
18 January 1997 Friendly	South Korea	1–0	Norway	Melbourne, Australia
CET (UTC+1)	Kim Do-Hoon 57'	Report		Stadium: Bob Jane Stadium; Attendance: 8,000; Referee: Gerry Connolly (Australia)
