= 1998 UEFA Champions League final =

Association football match

- Match programme cover
- Event: 1997–98 UEFA Champions League
Juventus	Real Madrid
(Italy)	(Spain)
0	1
- Date: 20 May 1998
- Venue: Amsterdam Arena, Amsterdam
- Referee: Hellmut Krug (Germany)
- Attendance: 48,500
- Weather: Mostly cloudy 16 °C (61 °F); 63% humidity

The 1998 UEFA Champions League final was a football match that took place at the Amsterdam Arena in Amsterdam, on 20 May 1998 to determine the winner of the 1997–98 UEFA Champions League. It pitted Real Madrid of Spain and Juventus of Italy. Juventus appeared in their third consecutive final, while Real Madrid were in their first of the Champions League era. Real Madrid won 1–0, to clinch their record breaking seventh European title, their first title for 32 years. The only goal was scored by Predrag Mijatović. The two teams would face each other in the final again in 2017.

== Venue ==
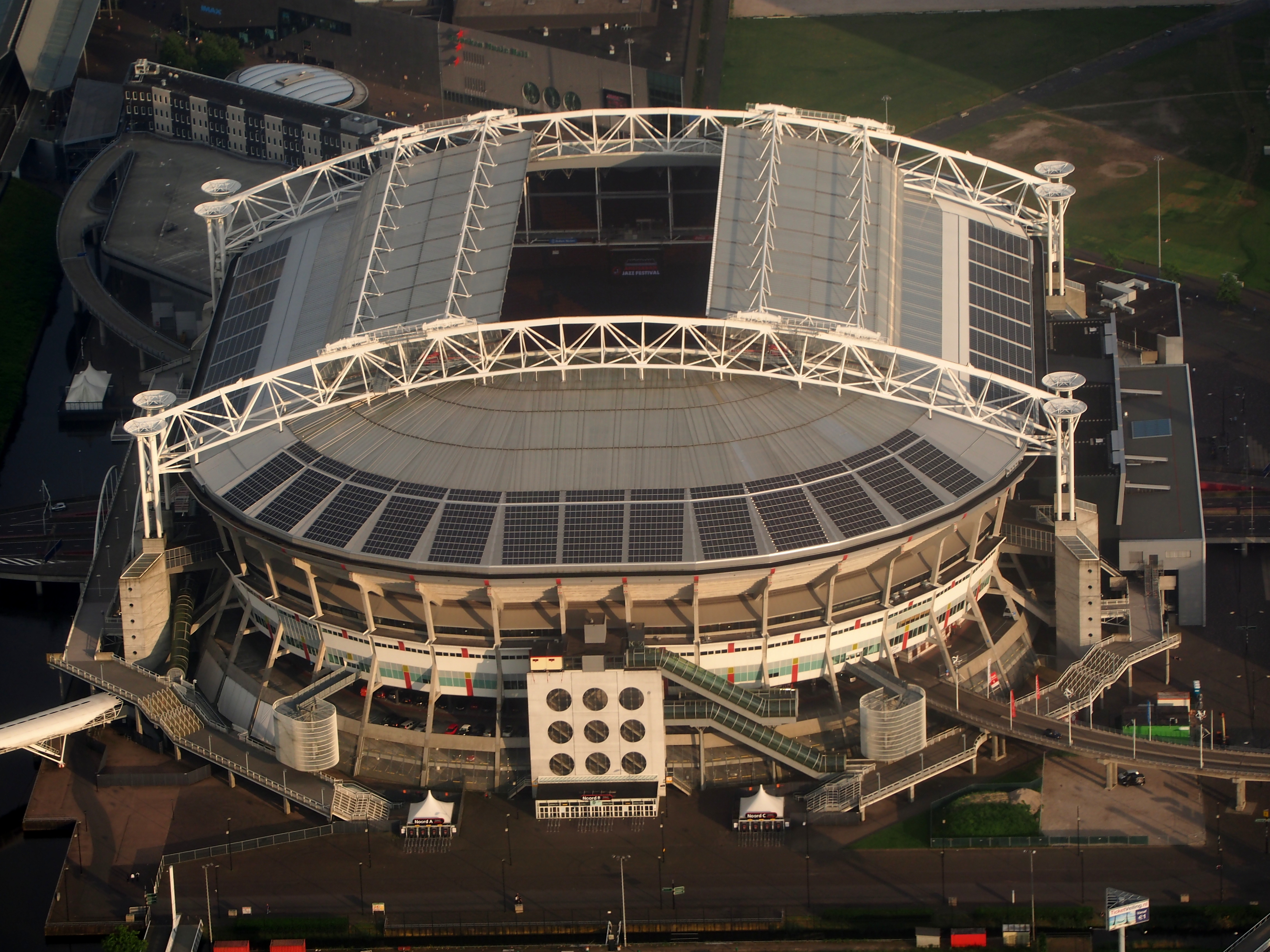
The Amsterdam Arena, host of the final.

The Amsterdam Arena has served as the home stadium of Ajax since 1996. The previous home for Ajax's European matches, the Olympisch Stadion, also hosted European finals.

One-legged finals include the 1962 European Cup final, in which Benfica defeated Real Madrid 5–3, and the 1977 European Cup Winners' Cup Final, in which Anderlecht were beaten 2–0 by Hamburger SV. It also hosted the second legs of the 1981 UEFA Cup Final between AZ '67 and Ipswich Town, and of the 1992 UEFA Cup Final between Ajax and Torino.

== Route to the final ==
(Italy) Juventus				Round	(Spain) Real Madrid			
Opponent	Result			Group stage	Opponent	Result		
(Netherlands) Feyenoord	5–1 (H)			Matchday 1	(Norway) Rosenborg	4–1 (H)		
(England) Manchester United	2–3 (A)			Matchday 2	(Portugal) Porto	2–0 (A)		
(Slovakia) Košice	1–0 (A)			Matchday 3	(Greece) Olympiacos	5–1 (H)		
(Slovakia) Košice	3–2 (H)			Matchday 4	(Greece) Olympiacos	0–0 (A)		
(Netherlands) Feyenoord	0–2 (A)			Matchday 5	(Norway) Rosenborg	0–2 (A)		
(England) Manchester United	1–0 (H)			Matchday 6	(Portugal) Porto	4–0 (H)		
Group B runners-up: Pos / Team / Pld / Pts; 1 / (England) Manchester United / 6 / 15; 2 / (Italy) Juventus / 6 / 12; 3 / (Netherlands) Feyenoord / 6 / 9; 4 / (Slovakia) Košice / 6 / 0; Source: UEFA				Final standings	Group D winner: Pos / Team / Pld / Pts; 1 / (Spain) Real Madrid / 6 / 13; 2 / (Norway) Rosenborg / 6 / 11; 3 / (Greece) Olympiacos / 6 / 5; 4 / (Portugal) Porto / 6 / 4; Source: UEFA			
Opponent	Agg.	1st leg	2nd leg	Knockout phase	Opponent	Agg.	1st leg	2nd leg
(Ukraine) Dynamo Kyiv	5–2	1–1 (H)	4–1 (A)	Quarter-finals	(Germany) Bayer Leverkusen	4–1	1–1 (A)	3–0 (H)
(France) Monaco	6–4	4–1 (H)	2–3 (A)	Semi-finals	(Germany) Borussia Dortmund	2–0	2–0 (H)	0–0 (A)

== Match ==
=== Details ===
20 May 1998
20:45 UTC+2

Juventus (Italy)	0–1	(Spain) Real Madrid
	Report	Mijatović 66'

Amsterdam Arena, Amsterdam
Attendance: 48,500
Referee: Hellmut Krug (Germany)

Juventus	Real Madrid

GK	1	(Italy) Angelo Peruzzi (c)
RB	3	(Italy) Moreno Torricelli
CB	13	(Italy) Mark Iuliano
CB	4	(Uruguay) Paolo Montero	(yellow card) 79'
LB	22	(Italy) Gianluca Pessotto		(substituted off) 70'
RM	7	(Italy) Angelo Di Livio		(substituted off) 46'
CM	14	(France) Didier Deschamps		(substituted off) 77'
CM	26	(Netherlands) Edgar Davids	(yellow card) 34'
LM	10	(Italy) Alessandro Del Piero
AM	21	(France) Zinedine Zidane
CF	9	(Italy) Filippo Inzaghi
Substitutes:
GK	12	(Italy) Michelangelo Rampulla
DF	6	(Portugal) Dimas Teixeira
DF	15	(Italy) Alessandro Birindelli
MF	8	(Italy) Antonio Conte		(substituted on) 77'
MF	20	(Italy) Alessio Tacchinardi		(substituted on) 46'
FW	16	(Italy) Nicola Amoruso
FW	18	(Uruguay) Daniel Fonseca		(substituted on) 70'
Manager:
(Italy) Marcello Lippi

GK	25	(Germany) Bodo Illgner
RB	17	(Italy) Christian Panucci
CB	5	(Spain) Manolo Sanchís (c)
CB	4	(Spain) Fernando Hierro	(yellow card) 23'
LB	3	(Brazil) Roberto Carlos	(yellow card) 37'
DM	27	(France) Christian Karembeu	(yellow card) 56'
DM	6	(Argentina) Fernando Redondo
CM	10	(Netherlands) Clarence Seedorf	(yellow card) 90+4'
AM	15	(Spain) Fernando Morientes		(substituted off) 81'
AM	8	(Federal Republic of Yugoslavia) Predrag Mijatović		(substituted off) 89'
CF	7	(Spain) Raúl		(substituted off) 90'
Substitutes:
GK	1	(Spain) Santiago Cañizares
DF	19	(Spain) Fernando Sanz
MF	11	(Spain) José Amavisca		(substituted on) 90'
MF	16	(Spain) Jaime Sánchez		(substituted on) 81'
MF	18	(Spain) Víctor Sánchez
MF	20	(Brazil) Sávio
FW	9	(Croatia) Davor Šuker		(substituted on) 89'
Manager:
(Germany) Jupp Heynckes

Assistant referees:
Thorsten Bastian (Germany)
Christian Schräer (Germany)
Fourth official:
Hans-Jürgen Weber (Germany)

Match rules

- 90 minutes.
- 30 minutes of golden goal extra time if necessary.
- Penalty shoot-out if scores still level.
- Seven named substitutes.
- Maximum of three substitutes.

=== Statistics ===
First half
	Juventus	Real Madrid
Goals scored	0	0
Total shots	3	6
Shots on target	1	2
Ball possession		
Corner kicks	1	2
Fouls committed	13	10
Offsides	1	0
Yellow cards	1	2
Red cards	0	0

Second half
	Juventus	Real Madrid
Goals scored	0	1
Total shots	6	2
Shots on target	3	1
Ball possession		
Corner kicks	2	1
Fouls committed	16	12
Offsides	2	1
Yellow cards	1	2
Red cards	0	0

Overall
	Juventus	Real Madrid
Goals scored	0	1
Total shots	9	8
Shots on target	4	3
Ball possession	49%	51%
Corner kicks	3	3
Fouls committed	29	22
Offsides	3	1
Yellow cards	2	4
Red cards	0	0

== See also ==
- 1998 UEFA Cup Winners' Cup final
- 1998 UEFA Cup final
- 1997–98 Juventus FC season
- 1997–98 Real Madrid CF season
- 2017 UEFA Champions League final – contested between same teams
- Juventus FC in international football
- Real Madrid CF in international football
