= Manuel Sinato =

Italian footballer

Personal information
- Date of birth: 30 May 1979 (age 47)
- Place of birth: Cuorgnè, Italy
- Height: 1.82 m (6 ft 0 in)
- Position: Forward

Youth career
- Juventus

Senior career*
Years	Team	Apps	(Gls)
1999–2000	Juventus	0	(0)
1999–2000	→ Biellese (loan)	33	(12)
2000–2002	Como	10	(0)
2001–2002	→ Carrarese (loan)	40	(7)
2002–2004	Crotone	14	(1)
2003	→ South Tyrol (loan)	12	(0)
2003–2004	→ Prato (loan)	8	(0)
2004	Biellese	18	(7)
2004–2006	Ivrea	52	(10)
2006–2010	Rodengo–Saiano	117	(24)
2010–2012	Tritium	60	(13)
2012–2013	Vallée d'Aoste	26	(7)
2013–2014	Chieri	30	(10)
2015–2017	Casale		(15)
2017–2018	Pro Settimo		
2018–2022	Ivrea		(13)
2022–2023	Agliè		(7)
2023–2024	Colleretto Giacosa		(10)
2024–2025	Asd Sangiustese		
- * Club domestic league appearances and goals

Manuel Sinato (born 30 May 1979) is an Italian footballer who plays as a forward for Italian amateur club ASD Sangiustese.

== Career ==
Born in Cuorgnè, the Province of Turin, Sinato started his career at Turin club Juventus FC Sinato played for Biellese in 1999–2000 Serie C2. In June 2000 Sinato and Luca Pellegrini were sold to Como in co-ownership deal for 150 million Italian lire and 100 million lire respectively, as part of Massimiliano Zazzetta deal for 150 million lire (Pellegrini returned to Juve in June 2001). In January 2001 Sinato left for Carrarese in temporary deal. The deal was renewed in summer 2001. In June 2002 the co-ownership deal between Juve and Como was renewed again, however in summer 2002 Sinato was sold to Como outright for about 100 million lire, which Juventus booked a financial cost of about €25,000 for the discount. Como immediately sold Sinato to Crotone in another co-ownership deal, as Sinato was a surplus for Como in 2002–03 Serie A. Juventus also paid Crotone to acquire Salvatore Aronica back to Turin in June 2002 and Crotone also acquired Pellegrini from Juve for 100 million lire. In January 2003 Sinato left for South Tyrol of 2002–03 Serie C2. At the start of 2003–04 Serie C1, Sinato left for fellow Serie C1 club Prato. In January 2004 Sinato left for Biellese again.

Sinato spent 2 seasons with the fourth division club Ivrea. In summer 2006 he left for Serie D club Rodengo–Saiano. He won promotion at the Group D winner of 2006–07 Serie D. On 21 August 2010 he left for fellow fourth division club Tritium. The team finished as the winner of Group A of 2010–11 Lega Pro Seconda Divisione as well as 2011 Supercoppa di Lega di Seconda Divisione.

After being released by Tritium he joined Vallée d'Aoste along with Andrè Cuneaz.
