= Raffaele Ametrano =

Italian footballer (born 1973)

Raffaele Ametrano Lorenzo
Personal information
- Date of birth: 15 February 1973 (age 53)
- Place of birth: Castellammare di Stabia, Italy
- Height: 1.70 m (5 ft 7 in)
- Position: Midfielder

Senior career*
Years	Team	Apps	(Gls)
1991–1992	Napoli	0	(0)
1992–1994	Ischia	53	(0)
1994–1996	Udinese	61	(2)
1996–2000	Juventus	1	(0)
1996–1997	→ Verona (loan)	19	(0)
1997–1998	→ Empoli (loan)	29	(3)
1998	→ Genoa (loan)	6	(0)
1999	→ Salernitana (loan)	11	(0)
1999–2000	→ Cagliari (loan)	11	(0)
2000–2001	Crotone	30	(0)
2001–2002	Napoli	22	(0)
2002–2004	Messina	32	(0)
2004–2007	Avellino	52	(0)
2007–2008	Potenza	28	(1)
2008–2010	Juve Stabia	47	(0)
Total		402	(6)
Medal record
Men's football
Representing Italy
UEFA European Under-21 Championship
Winner	1996 Spain
- * Club domestic league appearances and goals

Raffaele Ametrano (born 15 February 1973 in Castellammare di Stabia, Province of Naples) is a former Italian footballer who played as a midfielder. He represented Italy at the 1996 Summer Olympics. In 2010, he obtained a UEFA A coaching license, making him eligible to coach Lega Pro teams. He then became the assistant coach of F.B. Brindisi 1912.

== Honours ==
Italy U21

- 1996 UEFA European Under-21 Football Championship winner.
