= 1997–98 UEFA Champions League group stage =

International football competition

The group stage of the 1997–98 UEFA Champions League began on 17 September 1997 and ended on 10 December 1997. Eight teams qualified automatically for the group stage, while 16 more qualified via a preliminary round. The 24 teams were divided into six groups of four, and the teams in each group played against each other on a home-and-away basis, meaning that each team played a total of six group matches. For each win, teams were awarded three points, with one point awarded for each draw.

== Seeding ==
Seeding was based on the UEFA associations 1997 ranking. Title holders and champions of nations ranked 1–5 were put in the Pot 1. Champions of nations ranked 6–7 as well as runners-up of nations ranked 1–4 formed Pot 2. The remaining qualified runners-up (from the nations 5–8) and champions of nations ranked 8–9 formed Pot 3. The remaining six national champions formed Pot 4.

Key to colours in group tables
Group winners and best-ranked runners-up advance to the knockout stage

Pot 1
Assoc.	Team
TH	(Germany) Borussia Dortmund
1	(Italy) Juventus
2	(Spain) Real Madrid
3	(France) Monaco
4	(Germany) Bayern Munich
5	(Netherlands) PSV Eindhoven

Pot 2
Assoc.	Team
6	(Portugal) Porto
7	(England) Manchester United
1	(Italy) Parma
2	(Spain) Barcelona
3	(France) Paris Saint-Germain
4	(Germany) Bayer Leverkusen

Pot 3
Assoc.	Team
5	(Netherlands) Feyenoord
6	(Portugal) Sporting CP
7	(England) Newcastle United
8	(Turkey) Galatasaray
8	(Turkey) Beşiktaş
9	(Greece) Olympiacos

Pot 4
Assoc.	Team
12	(Belgium) Lierse
14	(Sweden) IFK Göteborg
15	(Norway) Rosenborg
16	(Czech Republic) Sparta Prague
22	(Ukraine) Dynamo Kyiv
27	(Slovakia) Košice

== Groups ==
=== Group A ===
Pos	Team	Pld	W	D	L	GF	GA	GD	Pts	Qualification	DOR	PRM	SPP	GAL
1	(Germany) Borussia Dortmund	6	5	0	1	14	3	+11	15	Advance to knockout stage	—	2–0	4–1	4–1
2	(Italy) Parma	6	2	3	1	6	5	+1	9		1–0	—	2–2	2–0
3	(Czech Republic) Sparta Prague	6	1	2	3	6	11	−5	5		0–3	0–0	—	3–0
4	(Turkey) Galatasaray	6	1	1	4	4	11	−7	4		0–1	1–1	2–0	—

Source: UEFA
17 September 1997
18:45

Galatasaray (Turkey)	0–1	(Germany) Borussia Dortmund
	Report	Chapuisat 74'

Ali Sami Yen Stadium, Istanbul
Attendance: 22,000
Referee: José María García-Aranda (Spain)
17 September 1997
20:45

Sparta Prague (Czech Republic)	0–0	(Italy) Parma
	Report

Stadion Letná, Prague
Attendance: 17,846
Referee: Dick Jol (Netherlands)

1 October 1997
20:45

Parma (Italy)	2–0	(Turkey) Galatasaray
Sensini 24'; Crespo 30'	Report

Stadio Ennio Tardini, Parma
Attendance: 15,922
Referee: Serge Muhmenthaler (Switzerland)
1 October 1997
20:45

Borussia Dortmund (Germany)	4–1	(Czech Republic) Sparta Prague
Herrlich 20'; Chapuisat 59', 75'; Heinrich 69'	Report	Siegl 76'

Westfalenstadion, Dortmund
Attendance: 42,000
Referee: Vítor Melo Pereira (Portugal)

22 October 1997
20:45

Parma (Italy)	1–0	(Germany) Borussia Dortmund
Crespo 62'	Report

Stadio Ennio Tardini, Parma
Attendance: 13,449
Referee: Gilles Veissière (France)
22 October 1997
20:45

Sparta Prague (Czech Republic)	3–0	(Turkey) Galatasaray
Siegl 34'; Gabriel 66'; Obajdin 86'	Report

Stadion Letná, Prague
Attendance: 11,108
Referee: David Elleray (England)

5 November 1997
20:45

Borussia Dortmund (Germany)	2–0	(Italy) Parma
Möller 50', 75'	Report

Westfalenstadion, Dortmund
Attendance: 40,000
Referee: Kim Milton Nielsen (Denmark)
5 November 1997
20:45

Galatasaray (Turkey)	2–0	(Czech Republic) Sparta Prague
Tugay 58', 86'	Report

Ali Sami Yen Stadium, Istanbul
Attendance: 14,700
Referee: Michel Piraux (Belgium)

27 November 1997
20:45

Parma (Italy)	2–2	(Czech Republic) Sparta Prague
Chiesa 22', 90' (pen.)	Report	Novotný 87'; Obajdin 89'

Stadio Ennio Tardini, Parma
Attendance: 14,847
Referee: Leif Sundell (Sweden)
27 November 1997
20:45

Borussia Dortmund (Germany)	4–1	(Turkey) Galatasaray
But 22'; Herrlich 34'; Zorc 48', 86' (pen.)	Report	Penbe 87'

Westfalenstadion, Dortmund
Attendance: 45,000
Referee: Rune Pedersen (Norway)

10 December 1997
20:45

Galatasaray (Turkey)	1–1	(Italy) Parma
Ilie 52'	Report	Chiesa 47'

Ali Sami Yen Stadium, Istanbul
Attendance: 14,000
Referee: László Vágner (Hungary)
10 December 1997
20:45

Sparta Prague (Czech Republic)	0–3	(Germany) Borussia Dortmund
	Report	Möller 29'; Kirovski 47'; Booth 71'

Stadion Letná, Prague
Attendance: 10,925
Referee: Hugh Dallas (Scotland)

=== Group B ===
Pos	Team	Pld	W	D	L	GF	GA	GD	Pts	Qualification	MUN	JUV	FEY	KOS
1	(England) Manchester United	6	5	0	1	14	5	+9	15	Advance to knockout stage	—	3–2	2–1	3–0
2	(Italy) Juventus	6	4	0	2	12	8	+4	12	Advance to knockout stage	1–0	—	5–1	3–2
3	(Netherlands) Feyenoord	6	3	0	3	8	10	−2	9		1–3	2–0	—	2–0
4	(Slovakia) Košice	6	0	0	6	2	13	−11	0		0–3	0–1	0–1	—

Source: UEFA
17 September 1997
20:45

Juventus (Italy)	5–1	(Netherlands) Feyenoord
Del Piero 3', 11' (pen.); Inzaghi 34'; Zidane 67'; Birindelli 81'	Report	Van Gastel 58' (pen.)

Stadio delle Alpi, Turin
Attendance: 12,622
Referee: Bernd Heynemann (Germany)
17 September 1997
20:45

Košice (Slovakia)	0–3	(England) Manchester United
	Report	Irwin 30'; Berg 61'; Cole 88'

Štadión Lokomotívy, Košice
Attendance: 9,550
Referee: Leif Sundell (Sweden)

1 October 1997
20:45

Manchester United (England)	3–2	(Italy) Juventus
Sheringham 37'; Scholes 69'; Giggs 89'	Report	Del Piero 1'; Zidane 90'

Old Trafford, Manchester
Attendance: 53,428
Referee: Antonio López Nieto (Spain)
1 October 1997
20:45

Feyenoord (Netherlands)	2–0	(Slovakia) Košice
Van Gastel 25' (pen.); Cruz 34'	Report

De Kuip, Rotterdam
Attendance: 31,500
Referee: Alain Sars (France)

22 October 1997
20:45

Košice (Slovakia)	0–1	(Italy) Juventus
	Report	Del Piero 34'

Štadión Lokomotívy, Košice
Attendance: 10,021
Referee: Edgar Steinborn (Germany)
22 October 1997
20:45

Manchester United (England)	2–1	(Netherlands) Feyenoord
Scholes 32'; Irwin 72' (pen.)	Report	Vos 82'

Old Trafford, Manchester
Attendance: 53,188
Referee: Serge Muhmenthaler (Switzerland)

5 November 1997
20:45

Juventus (Italy)	3–2	(Slovakia) Košice
Del Piero 42'; Amoruso 59'; Fonseca 60'	Report	Lyubarskyi 66'; Ferrara 70' (o.g.)

Stadio delle Alpi, Turin
Attendance: 3,505
Referee: Juan Ansuátegui Roca (Spain)
5 November 1997
20:45

Feyenoord (Netherlands)	1–3	(England) Manchester United
Korneev 86'	Report	Cole 30', 43', 73'

De Kuip, Rotterdam
Attendance: 40,597
Referee: Sándor Puhl (Hungary)

26 November 1997
20:45

Feyenoord (Netherlands)	2–0	(Italy) Juventus
Cruz 66', 87'	Report

De Kuip, Rotterdam
Attendance: 34,027
Referee: Nikolai Levnikov (Russia)
27 November 1997
20:45

Manchester United (England)	3–0	(Slovakia) Košice
Cole 40'; Faktor 84' (o.g.); Sheringham 90'	Report

Old Trafford, Manchester
Attendance: 52,535
Referee: Ahmet Çakar (Turkey)

10 December 1997
20:45

Juventus (Italy)	1–0	(England) Manchester United
Inzaghi 84'	Report

Stadio delle Alpi, Turin
Attendance: 47,766
Referee: Gilles Veissière (France)
10 December 1997
20:45

Košice (Slovakia)	0–1	(Netherlands) Feyenoord
	Report	Van Bronckhorst 81'

Štadión Lokomotívy, Košice
Attendance: 2,662
Referee: Jorge Coroado (Portugal)

=== Group C ===
Pos	Team	Pld	W	D	L	GF	GA	GD	Pts	Qualification	DKV	PSV	NEW	BAR
1	(Ukraine) Dynamo Kyiv	6	3	2	1	13	6	+7	11	Advance to knockout stage	—	1–1	2–2	3–0
2	(Netherlands) PSV Eindhoven	6	2	3	1	9	8	+1	9		1–3	—	1–0	2–2
3	(England) Newcastle United	6	2	1	3	7	8	−1	7		2–0	0–2	—	3–2
4	(Spain) Barcelona	6	1	2	3	7	14	−7	5		0–4	2–2	1–0	—

Source: UEFA
17 September 1997
20:45

Newcastle United (England)	3–2	(Spain) Barcelona
Asprilla 22' (pen.), 31', 49'	Report	Luis Enrique 73'; Figo 89'

St James' Park, Newcastle upon Tyne
Attendance: 35,274
Referee: Pierluigi Collina (Italy)
17 September 1997
20:45

PSV Eindhoven (Netherlands)	1–3	(Ukraine) Dynamo Kyiv
Jonk 40'	Report	Maksymov 33'; Rebrov 46'; Shevchenko 90'

Philips Stadion, Eindhoven
Attendance: 27,000
Referee: Rune Pedersen (Norway)

1 October 1997
20:45

Dynamo Kyiv (Ukraine)	2–2	(England) Newcastle United
Rebrov 4'; Shevchenko 28'	Report	Beresford 78'; Holovko 85' (o.g.)

Olympic Stadium, Kyiv
Attendance: 92,000
Referee: Peter Mikkelsen (Denmark)
1 October 1997
20:45

Barcelona (Spain)	2–2	(Netherlands) PSV Eindhoven
Luis Enrique 61', 74'	Report	Cocu 70'; Møller 86'

Camp Nou, Barcelona
Attendance: 82,000
Referee: Hellmut Krug (Germany)

22 October 1997
20:45

PSV Eindhoven (Netherlands)	1–0	(England) Newcastle United
Jonk 37'	Report

Philips Stadion, Eindhoven
Attendance: 29,200
Referee: Stefano Braschi (Italy)
22 October 1997
20:45

Dynamo Kyiv (Ukraine)	3–0	(Spain) Barcelona
Rebrov 6'; Maksymov 32'; Kalitvintsev 65'	Report

Olympic Stadium, Kyiv
Attendance: 95,030
Referee: Markus Merk (Germany)

5 November 1997
20:45

Newcastle United (England)	0–2	(Netherlands) PSV Eindhoven
	Report	Nilis 33'; De Bilde 90'

St James' Park, Newcastle upon Tyne
Attendance: 35,214
Referee: Günter Benkö (Austria)
5 November 1997
20:45

Barcelona (Spain)	0–4	(Ukraine) Dynamo Kyiv
	Report	Shevchenko 9', 32', 44' (pen.); Rebrov 79'

Camp Nou, Barcelona
Attendance: 52,200
Referee: Hugh Dallas (Scotland)

26 November 1997
20:45

Barcelona (Spain)	1–0	(England) Newcastle United
Giovanni 17'	Report

Camp Nou, Barcelona
Attendance: 26,000
Referee: Marc Batta (France)
27 November 1997
20:45

Dynamo Kyiv (Ukraine)	1–1	(Netherlands) PSV Eindhoven
Rebrov 19'	Report	De Bilde 65'

Olympic Stadium, Kyiv
Attendance: 80,000
Referee: Piero Ceccarini (Italy)

10 December 1997
20:45

PSV Eindhoven (Netherlands)	2–2	(Spain) Barcelona
Abelardo 54' (o.g.); De Bilde 56'	Report	Abelardo 32'; Giovanni 66'

Philips Stadion, Eindhoven
Attendance: 29,400
Referee: Anders Frisk (Sweden)
10 December 1997
20:45

Newcastle United (England)	2–0	(Ukraine) Dynamo Kyiv
Barnes 10'; Pearce 21'	Report

St James' Park, Newcastle upon Tyne
Attendance: 33,694
Referee: Hellmut Krug (Germany)

=== Group D ===
Pos	Team	Pld	W	D	L	GF	GA	GD	Pts	Qualification	RMA	ROS	OLY	POR
1	(Spain) Real Madrid	6	4	1	1	15	4	+11	13	Advance to knockout stage	—	4–1	5–1	4–0
2	(Norway) Rosenborg	6	3	2	1	13	8	+5	11		2–0	—	5–1	2–0
3	(Greece) Olympiacos	6	1	2	3	6	14	−8	5		0–0	2–2	—	1–0
4	(Portugal) Porto	6	1	1	4	3	11	−8	4		0–2	1–1	2–1	—

Source: UEFA
17 September 1997
20:45

Real Madrid (Spain)	4–1	(Norway) Rosenborg
Panucci 7'; Zé Roberto 39'; Raúl 43'; Morientes 83'	Report	Jakobsen 22'

Estadio Santiago Bernabéu, Madrid
Attendance: 53,000
Referee: Gilles Veissière (France)
17 September 1997
20:45

Olympiacos (Greece)	1–0	(Portugal) Porto
Giannakopoulos 6'	Report

Olympic Stadium, Athens
Attendance: 60,006
Referee: Sándor Puhl (Hungary)

1 October 1997
20:45

Porto (Portugal)	0–2	(Spain) Real Madrid
	Report	Hierro 14'; Raúl 78'

Estádio das Antas, Porto
Attendance: 32,300
Referee: Piero Ceccarini (Italy)
1 October 1997
20:45

Rosenborg (Norway)	5–1	(Greece) Olympiacos
Brattbakk 13', 79'; Strand 33', 43'; Rushfeldt 56'	Report	Ofori-Quaye 69'

Lerkendal Stadion, Trondheim
Attendance: 16,038
Referee: Hugh Dallas (Scotland)

22 October 1997
20:45

Rosenborg (Norway)	2–0	(Portugal) Porto
Rushfeldt 10'; Brattbakk 37'	Report

Lerkendal Stadion, Trondheim
Attendance: 17,214
Referee: Nikolai Levnikov (Russia)
22 October 1997
20:45

Real Madrid (Spain)	5–1	(Greece) Olympiacos
Šuker 34' (pen.), 66' (pen.); Morientes 44'; Víctor 85'; Roberto Carlos 90'	Report	Dabizas 18'

Estadio Santiago Bernabéu, Madrid
Attendance: 48,000
Referee: Pierluigi Collina (Italy)

5 November 1997
20:45

Porto (Portugal)	1–1	(Norway) Rosenborg
Jardel 8'	Report	Strand 88'

Estádio das Antas, Porto
Attendance: 11,000
Referee: Dermot Gallagher (England)
5 November 1997
20:45

Olympiacos (Greece)	0–0	(Spain) Real Madrid
	Report

Olympic Stadium, Athens
Attendance: 55,000
Referee: Hellmut Krug (Germany)

27 November 1997
20:45

Rosenborg (Norway)	2–0	(Spain) Real Madrid
Strand 42'; Brattbakk 53'	Report

Lerkendal Stadion, Trondheim
Attendance: 19,147
Referee: Paul Durkin (England)
27 November 1997
20:45

Porto (Portugal)	2–1	(Greece) Olympiacos
Jardel 29', 52'	Report	Georgatos 25'

Estádio das Antas, Porto
Attendance: 7,300
Referee: Michel Piraux (Belgium)

10 December 1997
20:45

Real Madrid (Spain)	4–0	(Portugal) Porto
Hierro 5'; Šuker 29', 73' (pen.); Roberto Carlos 49'	Report

Estadio Santiago Bernabéu, Madrid
Attendance: 66,000
Referee: Pierluigi Pairetto (Italy)
10 December 1997
20:45

Olympiacos (Greece)	2–2	(Norway) Rosenborg
Mavrogenidis 48'; Đorđević 88'	Report	Rushfeldt 49', 69'

Olympic Stadium, Athens
Attendance: 21,095
Referee: Günter Benkö (Austria)

=== Group E ===
Pos	Team	Pld	W	D	L	GF	GA	GD	Pts	Qualification	BAY	PAR	BES	GOT
1	(Germany) Bayern Munich	6	4	0	2	13	6	+7	12	Advance to knockout stage	—	5–1	2–0	0–1
2	(France) Paris Saint-Germain	6	4	0	2	11	10	+1	12		3–1	—	2–1	3–0
3	(Turkey) Beşiktaş	6	2	0	4	6	9	−3	6		0–2	3–1	—	1–0
4	(Sweden) IFK Göteborg	6	2	0	4	4	9	−5	6		1–3	0–1	2–1	—

Source: UEFA
17 September 1997
20:45

Bayern Munich (Germany)	2–0	(Turkey) Beşiktaş
Helmer 3'; Basler 70'	Report

Olympiastadion, Munich
Attendance: 38,000
Referee: Kim Milton Nielsen (Denmark)
17 September 1997
20:45

Paris Saint-Germain (France)	3–0	(Sweden) IFK Göteborg
Ngotty 27'; Lučić 51' (o.g.); Raí 82' (pen.)	Report

Parc des Princes, Paris
Attendance: 28,189
Referee: Paul Durkin (England)

1 October 1997
20:45

IFK Göteborg (Sweden)	1–3	(Germany) Bayern Munich
Lučić 86'	Report	Jancker 2'; Hamann 34'; Élber 89'

Ullevi, Gothenburg
Attendance: 26,503
Referee: Mario van der Ende (Netherlands)
1 October 1997
20:45

Beşiktaş (Turkey)	3–1	(France) Paris Saint-Germain
Derelioğlu 5', 42'; Sağlam 83'	Report	Simone 66'

BJK İnönü Stadium, Istanbul
Attendance: 12,056
Referee: Günter Benkö (Austria)

22 October 1997
20:45

Beşiktaş (Turkey)	1–0	(Sweden) IFK Göteborg
Derelioğlu 6'	Report

BJK İnönü Stadium, Istanbul
Attendance: 19,950
Referee: László Vágner (Hungary)
22 October 1997
20:45

Bayern Munich (Germany)	5–1	(France) Paris Saint-Germain
Élber 4', 73'; Jancker 21', 47'; Helmer 51'	Report	Simone 48'

Olympiastadion, Munich
Attendance: 46,000
Referee: Manuel Díaz Vega (Spain)

5 November 1997
20:45

IFK Göteborg (Sweden)	2–1	(Turkey) Beşiktaş
Pettersson 18' (pen.); R. Andersson 22'	Report	Derelioğlu 45'

Ullevi, Gothenburg
Attendance: 14,073
Referee: Amand Ancion (Belgium)
5 November 1997
20:45

Paris Saint-Germain (France)	3–1	(Germany) Bayern Munich
Gava 17'; Maurice 73'; Leroy 75'	Report	Babbel 28'

Parc des Princes, Paris
Attendance: 32,274
Referee: Piero Ceccarini (Italy)

26 November 1997
20:45

Beşiktaş (Turkey)	0–2	(Germany) Bayern Munich
	Report	Jancker 5'; Helmer 31'

BJK İnönü Stadium, Istanbul
Attendance: 22,000
Referee: Urs Meier (Switzerland)
26 November 1997
20:45

IFK Göteborg (Sweden)	0–1	(France) Paris Saint-Germain
	Report	Rabésandratana 88'

Ullevi, Gothenburg
Attendance: 19,323
Referee: Giorgos Bikas (Greece)

10 December 1997
20:45

Bayern Munich (Germany)	0–1	(Sweden) IFK Göteborg
	Report	Babbel 50' (o.g.)

Olympiastadion, Munich
Attendance: 27,000
Referee: Stefano Braschi (Italy)
10 December 1997
20:45

Paris Saint-Germain (France)	2–1	(Turkey) Beşiktaş
Gava 23'; Simone 58'	Report	Özdilek 37'

Parc des Princes, Paris
Attendance: 34,038
Referee: Antonio López Nieto (Spain)

=== Group F ===
Pos	Team	Pld	W	D	L	GF	GA	GD	Pts	Qualification	MON	LEV	SPO	LIE
1	(France) Monaco	6	4	1	1	15	8	+7	13	Advance to knockout stage	—	4–0	3–2	5–1
2	(Germany) Bayer Leverkusen	6	4	1	1	11	7	+4	13	Advance to knockout stage	2–2	—	4–1	1–0
3	(Portugal) Sporting CP	6	2	1	3	9	11	−2	7		3–0	0–2	—	2–1
4	(Belgium) Lierse	6	0	1	5	3	12	−9	1		0–1	0–2	1–1	—

Source: UEFA
17 September 1997
19:45

Sporting CP (Portugal)	3–0	(France) Monaco
Oceano 4'; Hadji 8'; Leandro 65'	Report

Estádio José Alvalade, Lisbon
Attendance: 27,000
Referee: Urs Meier (Switzerland)
17 September 1997
20:45

Bayer Leverkusen (Germany)	1–0	(Belgium) Lierse
Beinlich 40' (pen.)	Report

Ulrich-Haberland-Stadion, Leverkusen
Attendance: 22,500
Referee: Stefano Braschi (Italy)

1 October 1997
20:45

Lierse (Belgium)	1–1	(Portugal) Sporting CP
Huistra 88'	Report	Leandro 86'

Jules Ottenstadion, Ghent
Attendance: 7,100
Referee: Sándor Piller (Hungary)
1 October 1997
20:45

Monaco (France)	4–0	(Germany) Bayer Leverkusen
Henry 30', 83'; Ikpeba 72', 90'	Report

Stade Louis II, Monaco
Attendance: 8,038
Referee: David Elleray (England)

22 October 1997
20:45

Monaco (France)	5–1	(Belgium) Lierse
Henry 33'; Collins 51'; Ikpeba 66'; Trezeguet 88', 89'	Report	Van Meir 61'

Stade Louis II, Monaco
Attendance: 7,484
Referee: Terje Hauge (Norway)
22 October 1997
20:45

Sporting CP (Portugal)	0–2	(Germany) Bayer Leverkusen
	Report	Beinlich 70'; Emerson 82'

Estádio José Alvalade, Lisbon
Attendance: 22,500
Referee: Sergei Khusainov (Russia)

5 November 1997
20:45

Lierse (Belgium)	0–1	(France) Monaco
	Report	Ikpeba 74'

Jules Ottenstadion, Ghent
Attendance: 7,100
Referee: Leif Sundell (Sweden)
5 November 1997
20:45

Bayer Leverkusen (Germany)	4–1	(Portugal) Sporting CP
Emerson 16', 73'; Rink 84'; Frýdek 90'	Report	Hadji 44'

Ulrich-Haberland-Stadion, Leverkusen
Attendance: 22,500
Referee: Ahmet Çakar (Turkey)

26 November 1997
20:45

Monaco (France)	3–2	(Portugal) Sporting CP
Trezeguet 65'; Henry 75', 89'	Report	Luís Miguel 31'; Oceano 37' (pen.)

Stade Louis II, Monaco
Attendance: 9,287
Referee: José María García-Aranda (Spain)
26 November 1997
20:45

Lierse (Belgium)	0–2	(Germany) Bayer Leverkusen
	Report	Emerson 54'; Kirsten 66'

Jules Ottenstadion, Ghent
Attendance: 7,700
Referee: Graham Poll (England)

10 December 1997
20:45

Sporting CP (Portugal)	2–1	(Belgium) Lierse
Ramírez 46'; Marioni 67'	Report	Haagdoren 28'

Estádio José Alvalade, Lisbon
Attendance: 8,400
Referee: Leslie Irvine (Northern Ireland)
10 December 1997
20:45

Bayer Leverkusen (Germany)	2–2	(France) Monaco
Beinlich 29'; Meijer 57'	Report	Pignol 63'; Henry 81'

Ulrich-Haberland-Stadion, Leverkusen
Attendance: 22,500
Referee: Pierluigi Collina (Italy)

== Ranking of second-placed teams ==
Pos	Grp	Team	Pld	W	D	L	GF	GA	GD	Pts	Qualification
1	F	(Germany) Bayer Leverkusen	6	4	1	1	11	7	+4	13	Advance to knockout stage
2	B	(Italy) Juventus	6	4	0	2	12	8	+4	12	Advance to knockout stage
3	E	(France) Paris Saint-Germain	6	4	0	2	11	10	+1	12	
4	D	(Norway) Rosenborg	6	3	2	1	13	8	+5	11	
5	C	(Netherlands) PSV Eindhoven	6	2	3	1	9	8	+1	9	
6	A	(Italy) Parma	6	2	3	1	6	5	+1	9	

Source: RSSSF
Rules for classification: 1) Points; 2) Goal difference; 3) Goals scored; 4) Away goals scored; 5) Association coefficient; 6) Club coefficient.
