= César Pellegrín =

Uruguayan footballer (born 1979)

Personal information
- Full name: César Eduardo Pellegrín García
- Date of birth: March 5, 1979 (age 47)
- Place of birth: Montevideo, Uruguay
- Height: 1.72 m (5 ft 8 in)
- Position: Left-back

Senior career*
Years	Team	Apps	(Gls)
1995–1997	Danubio	32	(6)
1997–1998	Juventus	5	(0)
1998–1999	Ternana	12	(0)
1999–2000	Nacional	19	(3)
2001–2002	Danubio	18	(0)
2003	Central Español	12	(0)
2004	Deportivo Maldonado	25	(1)
2005	RoPS	5	(0)
2006	El Tanque Sisley	15	(4)
2007	Herediano	6	(0)
2008	Rah Ahan	11	(2)
2009	Rampla Juniors	7	(0)

International career
1997–1999	Uruguay U20	14	(2)
1997	Uruguay	6	(1)
- * Club domestic league appearances and goals

César Eduardo Pellegrín García (born 5 March 1979) is a Uruguayan former professional footballer who player as a left-back.

== International career ==
Pellegrín played in 1997 and 1999 FIFA U-20 World Cup. 1999 he won the silver medal.
