= Massimiliano Zazzetta =

Italian footballer

Personal information
- Date of birth: 10 October 1979 (age 47)
- Place of birth: San Benedetto del Tronto, Italy
- Height: 1.78 m (5 ft 10 in)
- Positions: Midfielder; defender

Youth career
- Juventus

Senior career*
Years	Team	Apps	(Gls)
1998–1999	Juventus	0	(0)
1998–1999	→ Pisa (loan)	29	(0)
1999–2000	Como	1	(0)
2000–2003	Juventus	0	(0)
2000–2001	→ Padova (loan)	14	(0)
2001–2002	→ Teramo (loan)	23	(0)
2002	→ Fano (loan)	13	(0)
2003–2008	Viterbese	75	(4)
2008–2009	San Marino	5	(0)
2009–2012	Sambenedettese	82	(5)

International career
1995–1996	Italy U16	3	(0)
1997	Italy U18	2	(0)
1998–1999	Italy U20	4	(0)
1999	Italy U21	0	(0)
- * Club domestic league appearances and goals

Massimiliano Zazzetta (born 10 October 1979) is an Italian former footballer who played as a midfielder or defender.

== Career ==
=== Juventus ===
Born in San Benedetto del Tronto, Marche, Zazzetta started his professional career at Piedmontese club Juventus FC After spending 1998–99 Serie C2 season at Pisa, he was sold to Como in co-ownership deal for 250 million lire. (€129,114) After only one appearance, Zazzetta returned to Turin for 150 million lire, Juventus paid Como via the sale of Manuel Sinato (150 million lire) and Luca Pellegrini (100 million lire; who returned to Juve in June 2001). Zazzetta signed a new 4-year contract with The Old Lady.

He spent 3 seasons in Serie C2 with 3 different clubs. The club got €10,000 from Teramo, but unable to cover the amortization cost of about €51,646 a season. In summer 2003 Zazzetta was released by Juventus, and the club write-down the residual contract value of Zazzetta, for about €51,000 [€51,646 = (250+150 million lire) over 4, 1 euro = 1936.27 lire]

=== Viterbese ===
Zazzetta spent 5 seasons with Viterbese. The club bankrupted in 2008.

=== San Marino ===
Zazzetta joined Sammarinese club San Marino Calcio in March 2009. He made 5 appearances in Italian 2008–09 Lega Pro Seconda Divisione. Zazzetta also played 1 of the 2 relegation "play-out" for the club, which the team winning Poggibonsi.

=== Sambenedettese ===
At the start of 2009–10 season Zazzetta returned to hometown club Sambenedettese. Zazzetta scored 4 times in 33 appearances in Eccellenza Marche. The club was the winner and promoted. In 2010–11 Serie D Zazzetta played 27 times and scored once. Zazzetta renewed his contract in June 2011.
