= Giovane Élber =

Brazilian footballer (born 1972)

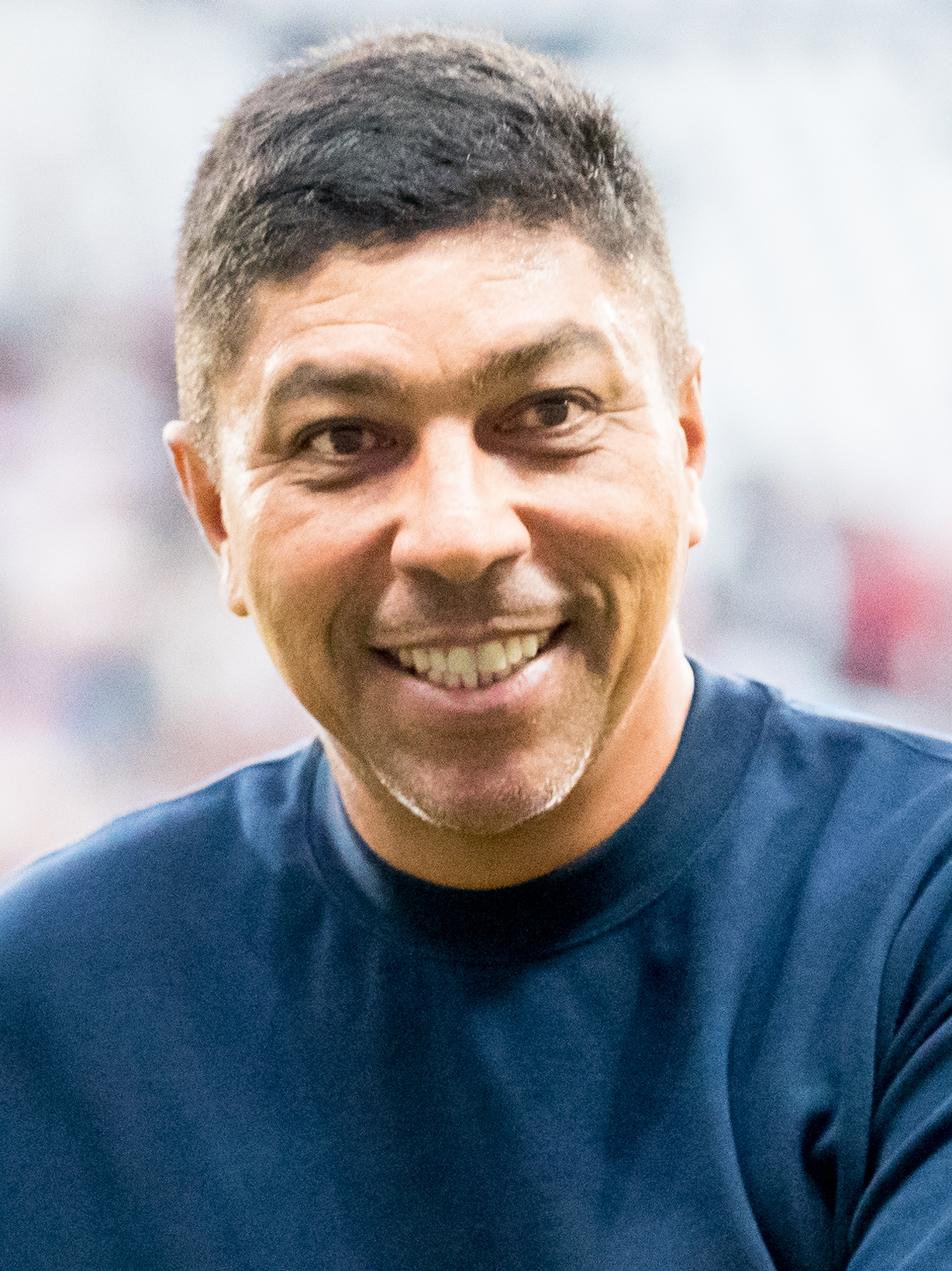
- Élber in 2022

Personal information
- Full name: Élber de Souza
- Date of birth: 23 July 1972 (age 54)
- Place of birth: Londrina, Brazil
- Height: 1.82 m (6 ft 0 in)
- Position: Striker

Youth career
- 1989–1990: Londrina

Senior career*
Years	Team	Apps	(Gls)
1990–1994	AC Milan	0	(0)
1990–1994	→ Grasshoppers (loan)	78	(55)
1994–1997	VfB Stuttgart	87	(41)
1997–2003	Bayern Munich	169	(92)
2003–2005	Lyon	30	(11)
2005–2006	Borussia Mönchengladbach	4	(0)
2006	Cruzeiro	21	(6)
Total		389	(205)

International career
1998–2001	Brazil	15	(7)
- * Club domestic league appearances and goals

Élber de Souza (born 23 July 1972), commonly known as Giovane Élber, is a Brazilian former professional footballer who played as a striker.

A prolific goalscorer in various clubs, Élber's career was mostly spent in Germany, where he represented most notably Bayern Munich (six full seasons), scoring a total of 133 league goals in 260 matches for three clubs.

== Club career ==
Born in Londrina, Paraná, Élber is a youth product of Londrina.

=== AC Milan ===
At the age of 18, he signed for AC Milan in 1990, Élber went almost unnoticed during his one-year spell with the Serie A side.

=== Grasshoppers ===
Subsequently, he moved to Switzerland Grasshoppers, initially on loan. He immediately started showing displays of offensive talent at his new club, namely in a 1992–93 UEFA Cup tie against Sporting CP where, after a 1–2 home loss, he was influential in the club's 4–3 aggregate win, scoring twice.

=== VfB Stuttgart ===
After more than 50 official goals for Grasshoppers, Élber signed with VfB Stuttgart of Germany in the 1994 summer. He scored in his Bundesliga debut, a 2–1 home win against Hamburger SV, and finished his debut season with eight goals, which would be the only campaign he netted in single digits for the following seven years.

In the 1996–97 season, Élber netted 20 official goals for Stuttgart, 17 in the league, and three in the cup, including both against Energie Cottbus in the final (2–0 win). At Stuttgart, he formed the so-called magic triangle (German: Magisches Dreieck) with Krassimir Balakov and Fredi Bobic.

=== Bayern Munich ===
The following summer, he moved to fellow league team Bayern Munich where, save for one year, he was always crowned the club's top scorer (Carsten Jancker prevented that honour); additionally, he was instrumental in the conquest of four leagues, the 2000–01 UEFA Champions League, scoring in both legs in the semi-finals against Real Madrid, and the 2001 Intercontinental Cup, whilst winning the Torjägerkanone award for 2002–03 with 21 goals; the Bavarians won the double.

At the Intercontinental Cup in Tokyo, Bayern Munich and Boca Juniors went to extra time, when Samuel Kuffour scored the only goal for Bayern. Immediately before, Élber brought down Clemente Rodríguez in an act that went unseen by referee Kim Milton Nielsen. Élber said in 2025 that his action was a foul and that the goal would have been disallowed by the video assistant referee if it had happened that year.

=== Lyon ===
31-year-old Élber then spent the vast majority of the 2003–04 campaign (played four matches with Bayern) in France with Lyon, replacing compatriot Sonny Anderson who had left for Spain. In the 2003–04 UEFA Champions League, he scored against his former club Bayern Munich to win 2–1 in Germany. Later on, he scored in a 2–2 draw against Porto in the quarter-finals; however, Lyon were eliminated from the competition after losing 4–2 on aggregate.

Eventually, he helped the club to the third of its seven consecutive Ligue 1 accolades, but then suffered a severe fibula and tibia injury which put him out of action for more than one year.

=== Borussia Mönchengladbach ===
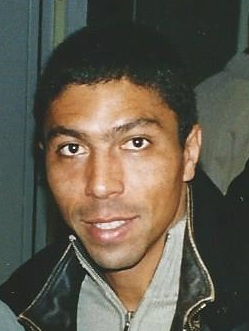
Élber in 2005

He made his comeback to professional football in Germany with Borussia Mönchengladbach, whom he joined in January 2005.

=== Cruzeiro ===
In January 2006, after nearly 15 years of absence, Élber returned to his country, finishing his career at Cruzeiro. After an emotional announcement, he retired from the club three months before the end of the season on 9 September, after injuries and the loss of his father.

== International career ==
At the 1991 FIFA World Youth Championship, Élber scored four in six matches as the under-20s lost to hosts Portugal, on penalties.

Due to stiff competition, Élber could not translate his club form to the Brazil national team. In his first year of international play, 1998, he scored six goals in as many games, but would only collect nine more caps in the following three years.

== Post-playing career ==
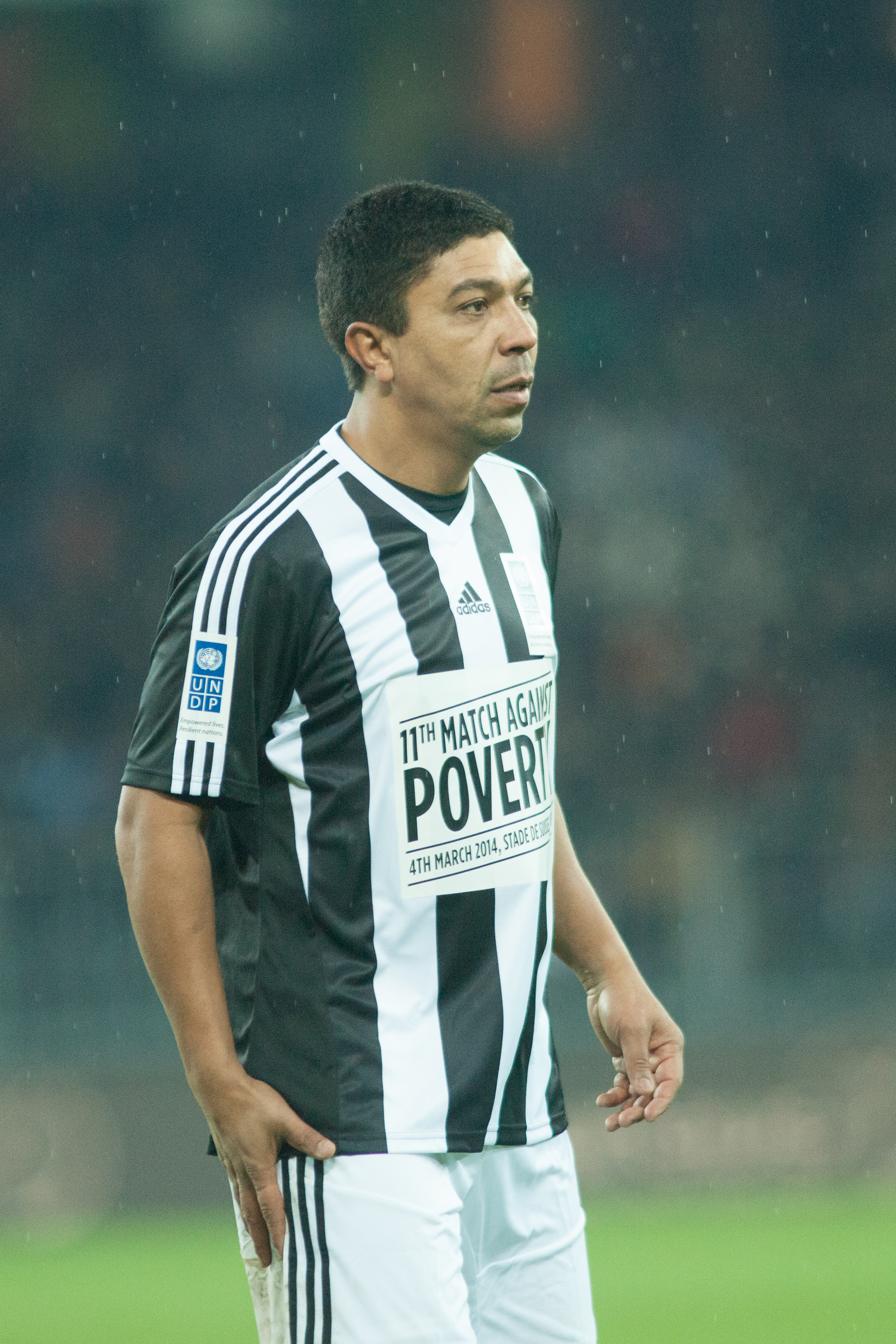
Élber in a charity match in 2014

After announcing his retirement, he then returned to Bayern, where he began working for the club as a scout, searching in his country for young talents. As of 2025, he was an ambassador for the club.

Élber works as a pundit for German television station Das Erste. He provided expert analysis during the 2013 FIFA Confederations Cup and reappeared in this capacity during the 2014 FIFA World Cup.

== Personal life ==
He is mostly referred to as Giovane Élber, which is a German variation of his Italian nickname il giovane Élber ("the young Élber").

== Career statistics ==
=== Club ===
Appearances and goals by club, season and competition
Club	Season	League			National cup (Note: Includes DFB-Pokal, Coupe de France and Copa do Brasil)		League cup (Note: Includes DFB-Ligapokal and Coupe de la Ligue)		Continental		Other		Total	
Club	Season	Division	Apps	Goals	Apps	Goals	Apps	Goals	Apps	Goals	Apps	Goals	Apps	Goals
AC Milan	1990–91	Serie A	0	0	—		—		—		—		0	0
Grasshoppers (loan)	1991–92	Nationalliga A	21	9			—		—		—		21	9
Grasshoppers (loan)	1992–93	Nationalliga A	30	25			—		4 (Note: Appearances in UEFA Cup)	2	—		34	27
Grasshoppers (loan)	1993–94	Nationalliga A	27	21			—		—		—		27	21
Grasshoppers (loan)	Total		78	55			—		4	2	—		82	57
VfB Stuttgart	1994–95	Bundesliga	23	8	1	0	—		—		—		24	8
VfB Stuttgart	1995–96	Bundesliga	33	16	1	0	—		—		—		34	16
VfB Stuttgart	1996–97	Bundesliga	31	17	6	3	—		1 (Note: Appearance in UEFA Intertoto Cup)	0	—		38	20
VfB Stuttgart	Total		87	41	8	3	—		1	0	—		96	44
Bayern Munich	1997–98	Bundesliga	28	11	6	5	2	2	8 (Note: Appearances in UEFA Champions League)	3	—		44	21
Bayern Munich	1998–99	Bundesliga	21	13	5	2	2	3	9	3	—		37	21
Bayern Munich	1999–2000	Bundesliga	26	14	3	2	0	0	12	3	—		41	19
Bayern Munich	2000–01	Bundesliga	27	15	1	0	0	0	16	6	—		44	21
Bayern Munich	2001–02	Bundesliga	30	17	3	1	1	0	11	6	2 (Note: One appearance in UEFA Super Cup, one appearance in Intercontinental Cup)	0	47	24
Bayern Munich	2002–03	Bundesliga	33	21	6	6	1	2	8	2	—		48	31
Bayern Munich	2003–04	Bundesliga	4	1	0	0	1	1	0	0	—		5	2
Bayern Munich	Total		169	92	24	16	7	8	64	23	2	0	266	139
Lyon	2003–04	Ligue 1	27	10	2	2	1	0	9	3	0	0	39	15
Lyon	2004–05	Ligue 1	3	1	0	0	0	0	0	0	1 (Note: Appearance in Trophée des Champions)	1	4	2
Lyon	Total		30	11	2	2	1	0	9	3	1	1	43	17
Borussia Mönchengladbach	2004–05	Bundesliga	0	0	0	0	—		—		—		0	0
Borussia Mönchengladbach	2005–06	Bundesliga	4	0	1	0	—		—		—		5	0
Borussia Mönchengladbach	Total		4	0	1	0	0	0	0	0	—		5	0
Cruzeiro	2006	Série A	21	6	5	6	—		1 (Note: Appearance in Copa Sudamericana)	0	13 (Note: Appearances in Campeonato Mineiro)	6	40	18
Career total			389	205	40	27	8	8	79	28	16	7	532	275

=== International ===
Appearances and goals by national team and year
National team	Year	Apps	Goals
Brazil	1998	6	6
Brazil	1999	4	0
Brazil	2000	3	1
Brazil	2001	2	0
Total		15	7

Scores and results list Brazil's goal tally first, score column indicates score after each Élber goal.

List of international goals scored by Giovane Élber
No.	Date	Venue	Opponent	Score	Result	Competition
1	8 February 1998	Los Angeles Memorial Coliseum, Los Angeles, United States	El Salvador	3–0	4–0	1998 Gold Cup
2	8 February 1998	Los Angeles Memorial Coliseum, Los Angeles, United States	El Salvador	4–0	4–0	1998 Gold Cup
3	14 October 1998	Robert F. Kennedy Memorial Stadium, Washington, United States	Ecuador	2–0	5–1	Friendly
4	14 October 1998	Robert F. Kennedy Memorial Stadium, Washington, United States	Ecuador	4–1	5–1	Friendly
5	14 October 1998	Robert F. Kennedy Memorial Stadium, Washington, United States	Ecuador	5–1	5–1	Friendly
6	18 November 1998	Estádio Castelão, Fortaleza, Brazil	Russia	1–0	5–1	Friendly
7	23 May 2000	Millennium Stadium, Cardiff, Wales	Wales	1–0	3–0	Friendly

== Honours ==
Grasshoppers

- Swiss Cup: 1993–94

Stuttgart

- DFB-Pokal: 1996–97

Bayern Munich

- Bundesliga: 1998–99, 1999–2000, 2000–01, 2002–03
- DFB-Pokal: 1997–98, 1999–2000, 2002–03
- DFB-Ligapokal: 1997, 1998, 1999, 2000
- UEFA Champions League: 2000–01
- Intercontinental Cup: 2001

Lyon

- Ligue 1: 2003–04
- Trophée des Champions: 2004

Cruzeiro

- Campeonato Mineiro: 2006

Individual

- FIFA World Youth Championship Silver Ball: 1991
- Nationalliga A top scorer: 1993–94
- Nationalliga A Foreigner of the Year 1993–94
- kicker Bundesliga Team of the Season: 1996–97, 1998–99, 2002–03
- Bundesliga top scorer: 2002–03 (shared with Thomas Christiansen)
- Goal of the Year (Germany): 1999
- Bayern Munich All-time XI
