= Opel Master Cup =

- Founded: 1996
- Abolished: 2000
- Last champions: (Germany) Bayern Munich

The Opel Master Cup was an association football tournament that mainly featured teams sponsored by car manufacturer Opel. It was held five times in different formats. The competition's first edition was held in 1996, and the following ones were held in 1997, 1999 (two times) and 2000. In 1996 and 1999 three teams competed in a round-robin tournament. In 1997 and 2000 four teams competed in a single elimination tournament with third place playoff. The first fourth editions of the cup had 45 minutes matches while the 2000 edition had regular 90 minutes matches.

== Winners ==
Season	Winner	Score	Runner-up	Third place	Fourth place	Venue
1996	(Germany) Bayern Munich	Bayern Munich won on goal difference	(Italy) Milan	(France) Paris Saint-Germain	—	Olympic Stadium, Berlin, Germany
1997	(Italy) Milan	0–0 (5–3 p)	(Germany) Bayern Munich	(France) Paris Saint-Germain	(Germany) Hertha BSC	Olympic Stadium, Berlin, Germany
January 1999	(Italy) Milan	3–1	(France) Paris Saint-Germain	(Belgium) Anderlecht	—	Paris, France
August 1999	(Italy) Milan	Milan won on goal difference	(France) Paris Saint-Germain	(Germany) Bayern Munich	—	Paris, France
2000	(Germany) Bayern Munich	3–1	(England) Manchester United	(Spain) Real Madrid	(Turkey) Galatasaray	Olympic Stadium, Munich, Germany
