= 1997–98 UEFA Champions League knockout stage =

International football competition

The knockout stage of the 1997–98 UEFA Champions League began on 4 March 1998 and ended with the final at the Amsterdam Arena in Amsterdam on 20 May 1998. The six group winners in the group stage, as well as the two best runners-up, competed in the knockout stage. For the quarter-finals, two group winners were randomly drawn against the two best runners-up from another group while the other four group winners face against each other with the restriction that two best runners-up cannot be drawn against the winners of their own group. The knockout stage was then played as a single-elimination tournament.

Each quarter-final and semi-final was played over two legs, with each team playing one leg at home; the team that scored the most goals over the two legs qualified for the following round. In the event that the two teams scored the same number of goals over the two legs, the team that scored more goals away from home qualified for the next round; if both teams scored the same number of away goals, matches would go to golden goal extra time and then penalties if the teams could not be separated after extra time.

== Draw dates ==
The draw for the quarter-finals and semi-finals was announced on 17 December 1997 and 20 March 1998. UEFA reported that the final would be played at Amsterdam Arena.

== Qualified teams ==
Group	Winners	Runners-up (best two qualify)
A	(Germany) Borussia Dortmund	—N/a
B	(England) Manchester United	(Italy) Juventus
C	(Ukraine) Dynamo Kyiv	—N/a
D	(Spain) Real Madrid	—N/a
E	(Germany) Bayern Munich	—N/a
F	(France) Monaco	(Germany) Bayer Leverkusen

== Bracket ==
Quarter-finals
(Italy) Juventus	1	4	5
(Ukraine) Dynamo Kyiv	1	1	2
(France) Monaco (a)	0	1	1
(England) Manchester United	0	1	1
(Germany) Bayer Leverkusen	1	0	1
(Spain) Real Madrid	1	3	4
(Germany) Bayern Munich	0	0	0
(Germany) Borussia Dortmund (a.e.t.)	0	1	1

Semi-finals
(Italy) Juventus	4	2	6
(France) Monaco	1	3	4
(Spain) Real Madrid	2	0	2
(Germany) Borussia Dortmund	0	0	0

Final
20 May – Amsterdam
(Italy) Juventus	0
(Spain) Real Madrid	1

== Quarter-finals ==
=== Summary ===
The quarter-final between German clubs Bayern Munich and Borussia Dortmund marked the first meeting of two teams from the same country in the Champions League (including the European Cup era, the first game between teams from the same country occurred in 1958–59). With Bayer Leverkusen also having qualified, it marked the first time three clubs from the same nation played in the knockout phase.

Team 1	Agg.	Team 2	1st leg	2nd leg
Bayer Leverkusen (Germany)	1–4	(Spain) Real Madrid	1–1	0–3
Bayern Munich (Germany)	0–1	(Germany) Borussia Dortmund	0–0	0–1 (a.e.t.)
Juventus (Italy)	5–2	(Ukraine) Dynamo Kyiv	1–1	4–1
Monaco (France)	1–1 (a)	(England) Manchester United	0–0	1–1

=== Matches ===
4 March 1998
20:45

Bayer Leverkusen (Germany)	1–1	(Spain) Real Madrid
Beinlich 18'	Report	Karembeu 74'

Ulrich-Haberland-Stadion, Leverkusen
Attendance: 22,500
Referee: Kim Milton Nielsen (Denmark)
18 March 1998
20:45

Real Madrid (Spain)	3–0	(Germany) Bayer Leverkusen
Karembeu 52'; Morientes 57'; Hierro 89' (pen.)	Report

Estadio Santiago Bernabéu, Madrid
Attendance: 59,000
Referee: Nikolai Levnikov (Russia)

Real Madrid won 4–1 on aggregate.

4 March 1998
20:45

Bayern Munich (Germany)	0–0	(Germany) Borussia Dortmund
	Report

Olympiastadion, Munich
Attendance: 60,000
Referee: Pierluigi Collina (Italy)
18 March 1998
20:45

Borussia Dortmund (Germany)	1–0 (a.e.t.)	(Germany) Bayern Munich
Chapuisat 109'	Report

Westfalenstadion, Dortmund
Attendance: 48,500
Referee: László Vágner (Hungary)

Borussia Dortmund won 1–0 on aggregate.

4 March 1998
20:45

Juventus (Italy)	1–1	(Ukraine) Dynamo Kyiv
Inzaghi 69'	Report	Husin 56'

Stadio delle Alpi, Turin
Attendance: 40,723
Referee: Paul Durkin (England)
18 March 1998
20:45

Dynamo Kyiv (Ukraine)	1–4	(Italy) Juventus
Rebrov 54'	Report	Inzaghi 29', 65', 73'; Del Piero 88'

Olympic Stadium, Kyiv
Attendance: 100,069
Referee: Marc Batta (France)

Juventus won 5–2 on aggregate.

4 March 1998
20:45

Monaco (France)	0–0	(England) Manchester United
	Report

Stade Louis II, Monaco
Attendance: 14,072
Referee: Manuel Díaz Vega (Spain)
18 March 1998
20:45

Manchester United (England)	1–1	(France) Monaco
Solskjær 53'	Report	Trezeguet 5'

Old Trafford, Manchester
Attendance: 53,683
Referee: Hellmut Krug (Germany)

1–1 on aggregate. Monaco won on away goals.

== Semi-finals ==
=== Summary ===
Team 1	Agg.	Team 2	1st leg	2nd leg
Real Madrid (Spain)	2–0	(Germany) Borussia Dortmund	2–0	0–0
Juventus (Italy)	6–4	(France) Monaco	4–1	2–3

=== Matches ===
1 April 1998
22:01 (Note: The match, originally scheduled for 20:45, was delayed by 76 minutes due to Real Madrid fans in the stadium's south stand bringing down the goal structure below them while the teams were posing for their pre-match photos. In addition to the CHF1.3 million monetary fine, UEFA punished Real for the following Champions League season by forcing it to play its first home group stage match at least 300km away from their home venue.)

Real Madrid (Spain)	2–0	(Germany) Borussia Dortmund
Morientes 24'; Karembeu 67'	Report

Estadio Santiago Bernabéu, Madrid
Attendance: 85,000
Referee: Mario van der Ende (Netherlands)
15 April 1998
20:45

Borussia Dortmund (Germany)	0–0	(Spain) Real Madrid
	Report

Westfalenstadion, Dortmund
Attendance: 48,500
Referee: Paul Durkin (England)

Real Madrid won 2–0 on aggregate.

1 April 1998
20:45

Juventus (Italy)	4–1	(France) Monaco
Del Piero 35', 45' (pen.), 62' (pen.); Zidane 87'	Report	Costinha 42'

Stadio delle Alpi, Turin
Attendance: 56,550
Referee: Nikolai Levnikov (Russia)
15 April 1998
20:45

Monaco (France)	3–2	(Italy) Juventus
Léonard 38'; Henry 50'; Špehar 83'	Report	Amoruso 15'; Del Piero 74'

Stade Louis II, Monaco
Attendance: 16,000
Referee: Urs Meier (Switzerland)

Juventus won 6–4 on aggregate.

== Final ==
The final was played on 20 May 1998 at the Amsterdam Arena in Amsterdam, Netherlands.

20 May 1998
20:45

Juventus (Italy)	0–1	(Spain) Real Madrid
	Report	Mijatović 66'

Amsterdam Arena, Amsterdam
Attendance: 48,500
Referee: Hellmut Krug (Germany)
