= Bernd Heynemann =

German football referee (born 1954)

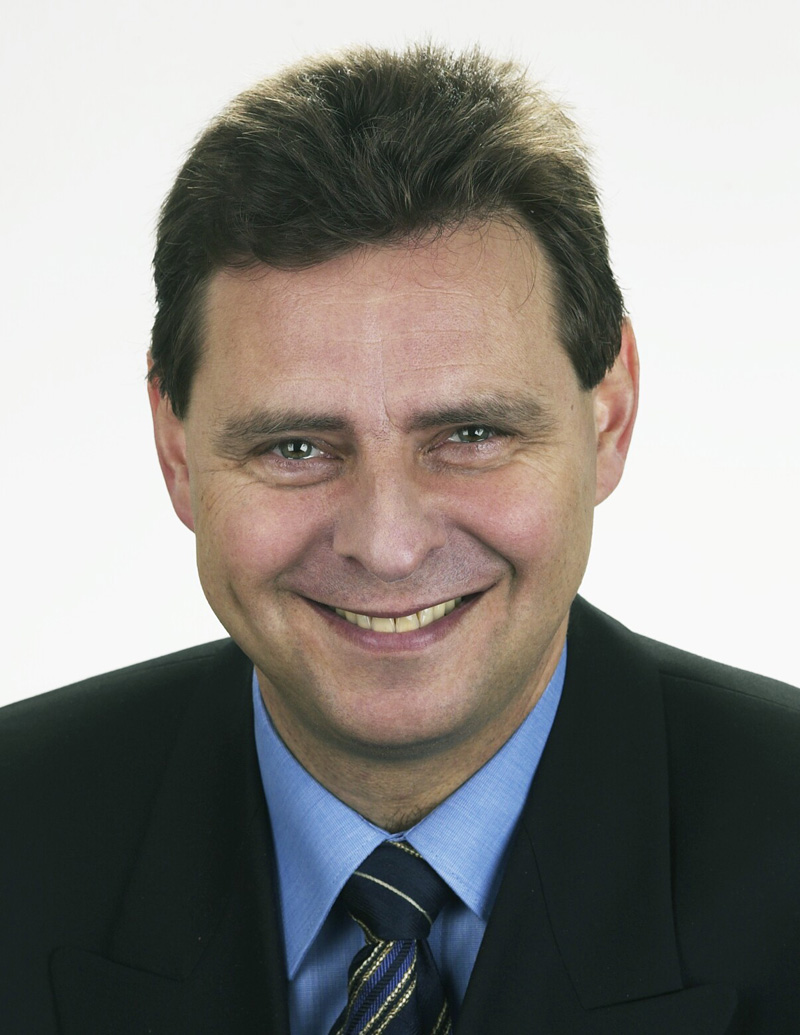
- Full name: Bernd Reinhold Gerhard Heynemann
- Born: 22 January 1954 (age 72); Magdeburg, East Germany
- Height: 1.96 m (6 ft 5 in)
- Other occupation: Politician

Domestic
Years	League	Role
1980–1991	DDR-Oberliga	Referee
1991–2001	Bundesliga	Referee

International
Years	League	Role
1988–1999	FIFA listed	Referee

Bernd Reinhold Gerhard Heynemann (born 22 January 1954 in Magdeburg) is a former German football referee and now a German politician.
