= Hellmut Krug =

German football referee

- Born: 19 May 1956 (age 70); Gelsenkirchen, West Germany
- Height: 1.96 m (6 ft 5 in)
- Other occupation: Teacher

Domestic
Years	League	Role
1985–2003	2. Bundesliga	Referee
1986–2003	Bundesliga	Referee

International
Years	League	Role
1991–2001	FIFA–listed	Referee

Hellmut Heinz Krug (born 19 May 1956, in Gelsenkirchen) is a retired German football referee. Krug officiated at both the 1994 FIFA World Cup and UEFA Euro 1996. In 1998, he refereed the UEFA Champions League final between Real Madrid and Juventus, and he also officiated a 2000 UEFA Cup semi-final first leg between Galatasaray and Leeds United. During the former match, Predrag Mijatović scored the controversial match-winning goal for Real Madrid while allegedly in an offside position (although replays later did not clarify the incident), which Krug did not disallow, as the linesman had not raised his flag to signal that the striker was offside. Krug additionally refereed at two UEFA European Championship tournaments, in 1992 and 1996.

Krug currently works as a pundit for German TV broadcaster Das Erste.

== Major matches refereed ==
Date	Match	Tournament	Venue	Result	Ref
20 May 1998	Juventus vs. Real Madrid	1998 UEFA Champions League final	Amsterdam Arena, Amsterdam	0–1	
