= 1998–99 St Johnstone F.C. season =

St Johnstone
1998–99 season
- Chairman: Geoff Brown
- Manager: Sandy Clark
- Stadium: McDiarmid Park
- Scottish Premier League: 3rd
- Scottish League Cup: Runners-up
- Scottish Cup: Semi–final
- Top goalscorer: League: Gary Bollan, Roddy Grant & Miguel Simão (4); All: Roddy Grant (6)
- Highest home attendance: 10,575, vs. Dundee, SPL, 23 May 1999
- Lowest home attendance: 2,679 vs. Stranraer, League Cup, 8 August 1998

The 1998–99 season saw St Johnstone compete in the newly formed Scottish Premier League where they finished in third place with 57 points, qualifying for the UEFA Cup. They also reached the 1998 Scottish League Cup Final, losing 2–1 to Rangers.

== Results and fixtures ==
St Johnstone's score comes first

| Win | Draw | Loss |

=== Scottish Premier League ===
| Match | Date | Opponent | Venue | Result | Attendance | Scorers |
|---|---|---|---|---|---|---|
| 1 | 1 August 1998 | Motherwell | A | 0–1 | 5,686 | |
| 2 | 15 August 1998 | Kilmarnock | H | 0–0 | 6,210 | |
| 3 | 23 August 1998 | Dundee | A | 1–0 | 3,641 | Scott 60' |
| 4 | 29 August 1998 | Rangers | A | 0–4 | 48,732 | |
| 5 | 12 September 1998 | Dunfermline Athletic | H | 1–1 | 5,997 | Squires 37' (o.g.) |
| 6 | 19 September 1998 | Aberdeen | H | 2–0 | 5,814 | Lowndes 17', McMahon 66' |
| 7 | 23 September 1998 | Celtic | A | 1–0 | 55,889 | Dasovic 15' |
| 8 | 26 September 1998 | Dundee United | H | 1–3 | 6,665 | Grant 84' |
| 9 | 4 October 1998 | Heart of Midlothian | A | 1–1 | 13,121 | Preston 58' |
| 10 | 17 October 1998 | Motherwell | H | 5–0 | 4,026 | O'Boyle 39', 85', Kernaghan 53', Simão 62', Dods 88' |
| 11 | 24 October 1998 | Kilmarnock | A | 2–2 | 9,336 | Dods 38', Lowndes 62' |
| 12 | 31 October 1998 | Dunfermline Athletic | A | 1–1 | 5,911 | McQuillan 54' |
| 13 | 8 November 1998 | Rangers | H | 0–7 | 9,636 | |
| 14 | 14 November 1998 | Celtic | H | 2–1 | 9,732 | Simão 45', McAnespie 78' |
| 15 | 21 November 1998 | Aberdeen | A | 1–0 | 10,004 | Simão 38' |
| 16 | 5 December 1998 | Dundee United | A | 1–1 | 7,293 | Grant 55' |
| 17 | 9 December 1998 | Heart of Midlothian | H | 1–1 | 4,808 | Kernaghan 8' |
| 18 | 12 December 1998 | Dundee | H | 1–1 | 6,033 | Bollan 85' |
| 19 | 19 December 1998 | Motherwell | A | 2–1 | 5,700 | Connolly 31', Grant 72' |
| 20 | 26 December 1998 | Rangers | A | 0–1 | 49,479 | |
| 21 | 29 December 1998 | Dunfermline Athletic | H | 1–1 | 6,070 | Kane 81' |
| 22 | 2 January 1999 | Aberdeen | H | 4–1 | 8,971 | Bollan 44', Kernaghan 52', O'Neil 75', 84' |
| 23 | 31 January 1999 | Celtic | A | 0–5 | 60,092 | |
| 24 | 6 February 1999 | Dundee United | H | 1–0 | 5,771 | Bollan 9' |
| 25 | 20 February 1999 | Heart of Midlothian | A | 2–0 | 12,229 | Scott 59', Kane 63' |
| 26 | 27 February 1999 | Dundee | A | 1–0 | 7,245 | Dods 88' |
| 27 | 13 March 1999 | Kilmarnock | H | 0–1 | 5,461 | |
| 28 | 20 March 1999 | Dunfermline Athletic | A | 0–1 | 5,504 | |
| 29 | 4 April 1999 | Rangers | H | 3–1 | 9,704 | Weir 14', Simão 73', McAnespie 90' |
| 30 | 17 April 1999 | Heart of Midlothian | H | 0–0 | 6,149 | |
| 31 | 20 April 1999 | Dundee United | A | 1–0 | 6,714 | Griffin 42' |
| 32 | 24 April 1999 | Celtic | H | 1–0 | 10,379 | O'Halloran 55' |
| 33 | 1 May 1999 | Aberdeen | A | 0–1 | 9,561 | |
| 34 | 8 May 1999 | Motherwell | H | 0–0 | 4,599 | |
| 35 | 15 May 1999 | Kilmarnock | A | 1–1 | 15,086 | Bollan 66' |
| 36 | 23 May 1999 | Dundee | H | 1–0 | 10,575 | Kane 71' |

=== Scottish League Cup ===
| Match | Date | Opponent | Venue | Result | Attendance | Scorers |
|---|---|---|---|---|---|---|
| Second round | 8 August 1998 | Stranraer | H | 3–0 | 2,679 | O'Halloran 67', Connolly 77', O'Boyle 84' |
| Third round | 18 August 1998 | Falkirk | A | 1–0 | 3,749 | Kane 90' |
| Quarter–final | 8 September 1998 | Hibernian | H | 4–0 | 8,165 | Lowndes 11', 32', McMahon 24', O'Neil 57' |
| Semi–final | 27 October 1998 | Heart of Midlothian | N | 3–0 | 12,027 | Dasovic 41', Preston 45', O'Boyle 87' |
| Final | 29 November 1998 | Rangers | N | 1–2 | 45,553 | Dasovic 8' |

=== Scottish Cup ===
| Match | Date | Opponent | Venue | Result | Attendance | Scorers |
|---|---|---|---|---|---|---|
| Third round | 23 January 1999 | Forfar Athletic | H | 1–0 | 3,714 | O'Neil 63' |
| Fourth round | 13 February 1999 | Livingston | A | 3–1 | 5,700 | Grant 18', 59', Scott 40' |
| Quarter–final | 6 March 1999 | Motherwell | A | 2–0 | 7,660 | Grant 71', Simão 80' |
| Semi–final | 11 March 1999 | Rangers | N | 0–4 | 20,664 | |

== Appearances and goals ==
Numbers in parentheses denote appearances as substitute.
Players with names struck through and marked † left the club during the playing season.
Key to positions: GK – Goalkeeper; DF – Defender; MF – Midfielder; FW – Forward

Players who made a first-team appearance
| No. | Pos. | Nat. | Name | Premier League | | Scottish Cup | | League Cup | | Total | |
| No. | Pos. | Nat. | Name | Apps | Goals | Apps | Goals | Apps | Goals | Apps | Goals |
|---|---|---|---|---|---|---|---|---|---|---|---|
| 1 | GK | SCO | Alan Main | 34 | 0 | 4 | 0 | 4 | 0 | 42 | 0 |
| 2 | DF | SCO | John McQuillan | 27 (1) | 1 | 3 | 0 | 5 | 0 | 35 (1) | 1 |
| 3 | DF | SCO | Allan Preston | 8 (7) | 1 | 0 (1) | 0 | 2 (2) | 1 | 10 (10) | 2 |
| 4 | MF | CAN | Nick Dasovic | 31 | 1 | 3 | 0 | 5 | 2 | 39 | 3 |
| 5 | DF | SCO | Jim Weir | 6 (1) | 1 | 1 | 0 | 0 | 0 | 7 (1) | 1 |
| 6 | DF | IRL | Alan Kernaghan | 26 | 3 | 3 | 0 | 3 | 0 | 32 | 3 |
| 7 | MF | SCO | ~~Philip Scott~~ † | 14 (2) | 2 | 2 | 1 | 1 | 0 | 17 (2) | 3 |
| 8 | MF | SCO | John O'Neil | 33 | 2 | 2 | 1 | 5 | 1 | 40 | 4 |
| 9 | FW | ENG | Roddy Grant | 14 (11) | 4 | 3 (1) | 2 | 1 (3) | 0 | 18 (15) | 6 |
| 10 | FW | NIR | George O'Boyle | 12 (1) | 2 | 0 | 0 | 5 | 2 | 17 (1) | 4 |
| 11 | MF | SCO | Paul Kane | 33 (1) | 3 | 4 | 0 | 4 | 1 | 41 (1) | 4 |
| 12 | FW | NIR | Gerry McMahon | 13 (6) | 1 | 1 (1) | 0 | 3 (1) | 1 | 17 (8) | 2 |
| 14 | FW | SCO | Paddy Connolly | 6 (3) | 1 | 1 | 0 | 1 | 1 | 8 (3) | 2 |
| 15 | DF | SCO | Gary Bollan | 32 (1) | 4 | 4 | 0 | 4 | 0 | 40 (1) | 4 |
| 16 | DF | NIR | Danny Griffin | 14 (5) | 1 | 2 (2) | 0 | 2 (1) | 0 | 18 (8) | 1 |
| 17 | MF | IRL | Keith O'Halloran | 10 (6) | 1 | 2 (1) | 0 | 1 (1) | 1 | 13 (8) | 2 |
| 19 | DF | SCO | Stuart McCluskey | 5 (2) | 0 | 0 | 0 | 0 | 0 | 5 (2) | 0 |
| 20 | MF | SCO | John Paul McBride | 2 (1) | 0 | 1 (1) | 0 | 0 | 0 | 3 (2) | 0 |
| 21 | DF | SCO | Andy Whiteford | 0 (1) | 0 | 0 | 0 | 0 (1) | 0 | 0 (2) | 0 |
| 22 | GK | SCO | Allan Ferguson | 2 (1) | 0 | 0 | 0 | 1 | 0 | 3 (1) | 0 |
| 23 | MF | SCO | Kieran McAnespie | 8 (10) | 2 | 1 (1) | 0 | 0 | 0 | 9 (11) | 2 |
| 24 | DF | SCO | Darren Dods | 34 | 2 | 4 | 1 | 5 | 0 | 43 | 3 |
| 28 | FW | ENG | Nathan Lowndes | 12 (17) | 2 | 2 (1) | 0 | 1 (2) | 2 | 15 (20) | 4 |
| 29 | FW | POR | Miguel Simão | 20 (6) | 4 | 1 (3) | 1 | 2 | 0 | 23 (9) | 5 |
| 31 | FW | SCO | Keigan Parker | 0 (2) | 0 | 0 | 0 | 0 | 0 | 0 (2) | 0 |

== League table ==
| Pos | Team | Pld | W | D | L | GF | GA | GD | Pts | Qualification or relegation |
|---|---|---|---|---|---|---|---|---|---|---|
| 1 | Rangers (C) | 36 | 23 | 8 | 5 | 78 | 31 | +47 | 77 | Qualification for the Champions League second qualifying round |
| 2 | Celtic | 36 | 21 | 8 | 7 | 84 | 35 | +49 | 71 | Qualification for the UEFA Cup qualifying round (Note: Since Rangers, the winners of the 1998–99 Scottish Cup, already qualified for the UEFA Champions League, Celtic, the losing finalist, earned a spot in the 1999–2000 UEFA Cup. As such, the league's UEFA Cup place moved down to third-placed St Johnstone. Scotland were also awarded an additional UEFA Cup place as the association was top of the UEFA Fair Play ranking. Kilmarnock earned this place as winners of the Scottish Fair Play ranking.) |
| 3 | St Johnstone | 36 | 15 | 12 | 9 | 39 | 38 | +1 | 57 | Qualification for the UEFA Cup qualifying round |
| 4 | Kilmarnock | 36 | 14 | 14 | 8 | 47 | 29 | +18 | 56 | Qualification for the UEFA Cup qualifying round |
| 5 | Dundee | 36 | 13 | 7 | 16 | 36 | 56 | −20 | 46 | |

Updated to match(es) played on end of season. Source: Soccerway and SPL official website
Rules for classification: 1) Points; 2) Goal difference; 3) Goals scored
(C) Champions
