= 1999–2000 St Johnstone F.C. season =

St Johnstone
1999–2000 season
- Chairman: Geoff Brown
- Manager: Sandy Clark
- Stadium: McDiarmid Park
- SPL: 5th
- Scottish Cup: Third round
- League Cup: Third round
- UEFA Cup: First round

The 1999–2000 season saw St Johnstone compete in the Scottish Premier League where they finished in 5th position with 42 points.

== Results ==
St Johnstone's score comes first

=== Legend ===
| Win | Draw | Loss |

=== Scottish Premier League ===
| Match | Date | Opponent | Venue | Result | Attendance | Scorers |
|---|---|---|---|---|---|---|
| 1 | 31 July 1999 | Heart of Midlothian | H | 1–4 | 6,705 | McQuillan 83' |
| 2 | 7 August 1999 | Celtic | A | 0–3 | 60,253 | |
| 3 | 15 August 1999 | Kilmarnock | H | 2–0 | 4,681 | Bollan 52', Lowndes 58' |
| 4 | 21 August 1999 | Hibernian | H | 1–1 | 6,163 | Lowndes 36' |
| 5 | 29 August 1999 | Aberdeen | A | 3–0 | 9,600 | Thomas 26', Jim Weir 68', Lowndes 75' |
| 6 | 11 September 1999 | Motherwell | H | 1–1 | 5,467 | Thomas 25' |
| 7 | 19 September 1999 | Dundee | A | 2–1 | 5,283 | Lowndes 81', 84' |
| 8 | 25 September 1999 | Rangers | A | 1–3 | 47,145 | Simão 61' |
| 9 | 16 October 1999 | Heart of Midlothian | A | 1–1 | 12,872 | Lowndes 57' |
| 10 | 24 October 1999 | Celtic | H | 1–2 | 10,200 | Lowndes 29' |
| 11 | 24 October 1999 | Dundee United | H | 0–1 | 4,236 | |
| 12 | 30 October 1999 | Motherwell | A | 0–1 | 6,127 | |
| 13 | 6 November 1999 | Dundee | H | 0–1 | 4,917 | |
| 14 | 21 November 1999 | Aberdeen | H | 1–1 | 6,279 | Jones 75' |
| 15 | 24 November 1999 | Hibernian | A | 1–0 | 9,343 | Jones 18' |
| 16 | 27 November 1999 | Dundee United | A | 0–1 | 9,367 | |
| 17 | 18 December 1999 | Kilmarnock | A | 2–1 | 6,002 | McBride 16', O'Neil 28' |
| 18 | 27 December 1999 | Dundee | A | 1–1 | 6,232 | Lowndes 44' |
| 19 | 22 January 2000 | Motherwell | H | 1–1 | 4,158 | Jones 44' |
| 20 | 5 February 2000 | Aberdeen | A | 1–2 | 17,568 | O'Neil 15' |
| 21 | 15 February 2000 | Rangers | H | 1–1 | 9,605 | Lowndes 86' |
| 22 | 22 February 2000 | Hibernian | H | 1–0 | 8,119 | O'Halloran 27' |
| 23 | 26 February 2000 | Dundee United | H | 2–0 | 4,732 | Griffin 51', Lowndes 90' |
| 24 | 4 March 2000 | Rangers | A | 0–0 | 49,907 | |
| 25 | 11 March 2000 | Celtic | A | 1–4 | 59,530 | Connolly 34' |
| 26 | 15 March 2000 | Heart of Midlothian | H | 0–1 | 4,468 | |
| 27 | 18 March 2000 | Kilmarnock | H | 0–0 | 4,688 | |
| 28 | 25 March 2000 | Dundee | H | 2–1 | 4,655 | Bollan 45', Millar 90' |
| 29 | 1 April 2000 | Motherwell | A | 1–2 | 5,900 | Russell 46' |
| 30 | 15 April 2000 | Hibernian | A | 3–3 | 9,211 | O'Neil 68', McAnespie 72', Parker 89' |
| 31 | 23 April 2000 | Rangers | H | 0–2 | 10,016 | |
| 32 | 29 April 2000 | Dundee United | A | 1–0 | 6,243 | Dods 67' |
| 33 | 2 May 2000 | Aberdeen | H | 2–1 | 4,217 | Dods 30', Kane 90' |
| 34 | 6 May 2000 | Heart of Midlothian | A | 0–0 | 12,628 | |
| 35 | 13 May 2000 | Celtic | H | 0–0 | 6,729 | |
| 36 | 21 May 2000 | Kilmarnock | A | 2–3 | 9,192 | Millar 76', Parker 87' |

=== Scottish League Cup ===
| Match | Date | Opponent | Venue | Result | Attendance | Scorers |
|---|---|---|---|---|---|---|
| R3 | 12 October 1999 | Dundee United | A | 1–2 | 4,805 | Griffin 54' |

=== Scottish Cup ===
| Match | Date | Opponent | Venue | Result | Attendance | Scorers |
|---|---|---|---|---|---|---|
| R3 | 30 January 2000 | Rangers | H | 0–2 | 9,099 | |

=== UEFA Cup ===
| Match | Date | Opponent | Venue | Result | Attendance | Scorers |
|---|---|---|---|---|---|---|
| QR 1st Leg | 12 August 1999 | (Finland) Vaasan Palloseura | A | 1–1 | 2,256 | Lowndes 76' |
| QR 2nd Leg | 26 August 1999 | (Finland) Vaasan Palloseura | H | 2–0 | 8,392 | Simão 87', 90' |
| R1 1st Leg | 16 September 1999 | (France) AS Monaco | A | 0–3 | 7,000 | |
| R1 2nd Leg | 30 September 1999 | (France) AS Monaco | H | 3–3 | 7,706 | Léonard 5' (o.g.), Dasovic 33', O'Neil 76' |

== League table ==
| Pos | Team | Pld | W | D | L | GF | GA | GD | Pts | Qualification or relegation |
|---|---|---|---|---|---|---|---|---|---|---|
| 3 | Heart of Midlothian | 36 | 15 | 9 | 12 | 47 | 40 | +7 | 54 | Qualification for the UEFA Cup qualifying round |
| 4 | Motherwell | 36 | 14 | 10 | 12 | 49 | 63 | −14 | 52 | |
| 5 | St Johnstone | 36 | 10 | 12 | 14 | 36 | 44 | −8 | 42 | |
| 6 | Hibernian | 36 | 10 | 11 | 15 | 49 | 61 | −12 | 41 | |
| 7 | Dundee | 36 | 12 | 5 | 19 | 45 | 64 | −19 | 41 | |

Updated to match(es) played on end of season. Source: Scottish Professional Football League
Rules for classification: 1) Points; 2) Goal difference; 3) Goals scored
