= 1998–99 Rangers F.C. season =

Rangers
1998–99 season
- Chairman: David Murray
- Manager: Dick Advocaat
- Ground: Ibrox Stadium
- Scottish Premier League: 1st (champions)
- Scottish Cup: Winners
- League Cup: Winners
- UEFA Cup: Third round
- Top goalscorer: League: Rod Wallace (19); All: Rod Wallace (27)
Home colours	Away colours

The 1998–99 season was the 119th season of competitive football by Rangers.

== Overview ==
Rangers played a total of 55 competitive matches during the 1998–99 season. They started the season under new management with Dick Advocaat replacing Walter Smith. The squad Smith had left behind was past its best so Advocaat, with the financial backing of Chairman David Murray, set about rebuilding almost the entire squad.

Success quickly followed and Advocaat built a team that gave the club their first domestic treble since the 1992–93 season. The Scottish Cup was secured by a 1–0 win against Celtic and the League Cup by a 2–1 defeat of St Johnstone.

The club enjoyed its best season in Europe since 1992–93 as well, reaching the third round of the UEFA Cup before being knocked out by Italian side Parma.

== Transfers ==
=== In ===
Date	Player	From	Fee
19 May 1998	(Netherlands) Arthur Numan	(Netherlands) PSV Eindhoven	£5,000,000
6 July 1998	(Argentina) Gabriel Amato	(Spain) Real Mallorca	£4,200,000
6 July 1998	(Netherlands) Giovanni van Bronckhorst	(Netherlands) Feyenoord	£5,000,000 plus Peter van Vossen
15 July 1998	(Russia) Andrei Kanchelskis	(Italy) Fiorentina	£5,500,000
16 July 1998	(France) Lionel Charbonnier	(France) Auxerre	£1,200,000
16 July 1998	(England) Rod Wallace	(England) Leeds United	Free
26 July 1998	(Romania) Daniel Prodan	(Spain) Atlético Madrid	£2,200,000
4 August 1998	(Scotland) Colin Hendry	(England) Blackburn Rovers	£4,000,000
6 November 1998	(France) Stéphane Guivarc'h	(England) Newcastle United	£3,500,000
14 December 1998	(Scotland) Neil McCann	(Scotland) Heart of Midlothian	£1,800,000
24 December 1998	(Germany) Stefan Klos	(Germany) Borussia Dortmund	£700,000
1 January 1999	(Northern Ireland) Lee Feeney	(Northern Ireland) Linfield	£100,000
1 April 1999	(Australia) Craig Moore	(England) Crystal Palace	£1,000,000
1 April 1999	(United States) Claudio Reyna	(Germany) VfL Wolfsburg	£1,200,000

=== Out ===
Date	Player	To	Fee
13 May 1998	(Scotland) Alan McLaren	Retired	
18 May 1998	(Scotland) Richard Gough	(United States) San Jose Clash	Free
26 May 1998	(Scotland) Andy Goram	(England) Notts County	Free
31 May 1998	(Scotland) Michael Rae	(Scotland) Huntly	Free
1 June 1998	(Scotland) Stuart McCall	(England) Bradford City	Free
3 June 1998	(Scotland) Ally McCoist	(Scotland) Kilmarnock	Free
13 June 1998	(Scotland) Ian Durrant	(Scotland) Kilmarnock	Free
19 June 1998	(Sweden) Joachim Björklund	(Spain) Valencia	£2,500,000
29 June 1998	(Scotland) Stephen Wright	(England) Bradford City	Free
1 July 1998	(Denmark) Brian Laudrup	(England) Chelsea	Free
1 July 1998	(Scotland) Alec Cleland	(England) Everton	Free
7 July 1998	(Netherlands) Peter van Vossen	(Netherlands) Feyenoord	Part-exchange for Giovanni van Bronckhorst
6 October 1998	(Australia) Craig Moore	(England) Crystal Palace	£800,000
22 October 1998	(Italy) Gennaro Gattuso	(Italy) Salernitana	£2,800,000
6 November 1998	(Federal Republic of Yugoslavia) Gordan Petric	(England) Crystal Palace	£400,000
13 November 1998	(Scotland) David Graham	(Scotland) Dunfermline Athletic	Free
22 February 1999	(Scotland) Steven Boyack	(Scotland) Dundee	£25,000

- Expendure: ▼£34,900,000
- Income: ▲£6,425,000
- Total loss/gain: ▼£28,475,000

== Appearances ==
List of squad players, including number of appearances by competition

No.	Pos	Nat	Player	Total		Premier League		FA Cup		League Cup		UEFA Cup	
No.	Pos	Nat	Player	Apps	Goals	Apps	Goals	Apps	Goals	Apps	Goals	Apps	Goals
1	GK	(France) FRA	Lionel Charbonnier	19	0	11	0	0	0	3	0	5	0
2	DF	(Italy) ITA	Sergio Porrini	54	3	35	2	5	0	4	0	10	1
3	DF	(Italy) ITA	Lorenzo Amoruso	49	3	33	1	4	1	3	1	9	0
4	DF	(Romania) ROU	Daniel Prodan	0	0	0	0	0	0	0	0	0	0
5	DF	(Netherlands) NED	Arthur Numan	19	0	8+2	0	0	0	2+1	0	6	0
6	MF	(Scotland) SCO	Barry Ferguson	39	2	22	1	2+1	0	4	1	10	0
7	MF	(Russia) RUS	Andrei Kanchelskis	45	9	30+1	7	4+1	1	2	0	7	1
8	MF	(Netherlands) NED	Giovanni van Bronckhorst	53	10	35	7	4+1	1	4	0	9	2
9	FW	(Scotland) SCO	Gordon Durie	13	1	1+4	0	0	0	0+2	1	4+2	0
10	FW	(Argentina) ARG	Gabriel Amato	31	9	13+7	6	1+2	0	2	1	0+6	2
11	MF	(Germany) GER	Jörg Albertz	53	19	33+1	11	5	1	4	3	8+2	4
12	DF	(Sweden) SWE	Jonas Thern	2	0	1	0	0	0	0	0	1	0
13	GK	(Finland) FIN	Antti Niemi	14	0	7	0	0	0	1	0	5+1	0
14	MF	(Scotland) SCO	Ian Ferguson	26	1	4+9	0	0+1	0	0+3	1	5+4	0
15	DF	(Federal Republic of Yugoslavia) YUG	Gordan Petrić	2	0	0	0	0	0	0	0	1+1	0
15	FW	(France) FRA	Stéphane Guivarc'h (from 6 November)	18	7	10+3	5	3+1	1	1	1	0	0
16	FW	(England) ENG	Rod Wallace	51	27	34	19	5	3	4	2	8	3
17	MF	(Scotland) SCO	Derek McInnes	9	0	0+7	0	1+1	0	0	0	0	0
18	MF	(Italy) ITA	Gennaro Gattuso	11	1	3+2	0	0	0	1	0	2+3	1
18	MF	(Scotland) SCO	Neil McCann (from 14 December)	24	8	15+4	5	5	3	0	0	0	0
19 / 38	DF	(Australia) AUS	Craig Moore	14	0	7	0	0	0	1+1	0	5	0
19	GK	(Germany) GER	Stefan Klos (from 24 December)	23	0	18	0	5	0	0	0	0	0
20	FW	(Finland) FIN	Jonatan Johansson	37	17	13+12	8	1+2	3	2	1	6+1	5
21	DF	(Norway) NOR	Ståle Stensaas	2	0	1	0	0	0	0	0	0+1	0
22	DF	(Scotland) SCO	Scott Wilson	20	1	7+5	1	1+4	0	1	0	1+1	0
23	FW	(Scotland) SCO	David Graham	5	0	0+3	0	0	0	0	0	1+1	0
24	MF	(Scotland) SCO	Barry Nicholson	6	0	3+3	0	0	0	0	0	0	0
25	DF	(Australia) AUS	Tony Vidmar	39	2	26+2	1	5	1	2	0	3+1	0
27	MF	(Scotland) SCO	Charlie Miller	21	4	2+13	3	1+1	0	0+2	1	0+2	0
28	DF	(Italy) ITA	Luigi Riccio	1	0	0+1	0	0	0	0	0	0	0
29	FW	(Chile) CHI	Sebastian Rozental	3	0	0+3	0	0	0	0	0	0	0
31	FW	(Northern Ireland) NIR	Lee Feeney	1	0	0+1	0	0	0	0	0	0	0
35	DF	(Scotland) SCO	Colin Hendry	32	0	17+3	0	3	0	3+1	0	4+1	0
40	MF	(United States) USA	Claudio Reyna	6	0	6	0	0	0	0	0	0	0

== Results ==
All results are written with Rangers' score first.

=== Scottish Premier League ===
Date	Opponent	Venue	Result	Attendance	Scorers
1 August 1998	Heart of Midlothian	A	1–2	15,892	Wallace
15 August 1998	Motherwell	H	2–1	49,275	Wallace, Albertz (pen.)
22 August 1998	Kilmarnock	A	3–1	17,608	Wallace, Albertz (pen.), Miller
29 August 1998	St Johnstone	H	4–0	48,732	Wallace, Albertz (pen.), Kanchelskis, van Bronckhorst
12 September 1998	Dundee United	A	0–0	12,788	
20 September 1998	Celtic	H	0–0	50,026	
23 September 1998	Aberdeen	A	1–1	17,862	Wallace
26 September 1998	Dunfermline Athletic	A	2–0	11,507	Johansson, B.Ferguson
4 October 1998	Dundee	H	1–0	48,348	Albertz
17 October 1998	Heart of Midlothian	H	3–0	49,749	Wallace (2), Johansson
28 October 1998	Motherwell	A	0–1	11,777	
31 October 1998	Dundee United	H	2–1	49,503	Wallace, Amoruso
8 November 1998	St Johnstone	A	7–0	9,636	Wallace, Johansson, Albertz (2, 2 (pens.)), Kanchelskis, Guivarc'h (2)
14 November 1998	Aberdeen	H	2–1	49,479	van Bronckhorst, Kanchelskis
21 November 1998	Celtic	A	1–5	59,703	van Bronckhorst
5 December 1998	Dunfermline Athletic	H	1–1	47,465	van Bronckhorst
12 December 1998	Kilmarnock	H	1–0	49,781	Wallace
19 December 1998	Heart of Midlothian	A	3–2	17,134	Guivarc'h (2), Wallace
26 December 1998	St Johnstone	H	1–0	49,479	Porrini
30 December 1998	Dundee United	A	2–1	11,707	Wilson, Wallace
3 January 1999	Celtic	H	2–2	50,059	Amato, Wallace
27 January 1999	Dundee	A	4–0	9,453	Miller (2), Guivarc'h, Johansson
30 January 1999	Aberdeen	A	4–2	19,537	Porrini, Wallace, Albertz (pen.), Kanchelskis
7 February 1999	Dunfermline Athletic	A	3–0	11,500	Kanchelskis, Johansson (2)
20 February 1999	Dundee	H	6–1	49,462	Albertz(3, 1 pen), McCann (2), van Bronckhorst
28 February 1999	Kilmarnock	A	5–0	16,242	McCann, Wallace (3), Johansson
13 March 1999	Motherwell	H	2–1	49,483	Wallace, Johansson
20 March 1999	Dundee United	H	0–1	49,164	
4 April 1999	St Johnstone	A	1–3	9,740	Moore
14 April 1999	Dunfermline Athletic	H	1–0	46,220	van Bronckhorst
18 April 1999	Dundee	A	1–1	11,051	Vidmar
25 April 1999	Aberdeen	H	3–1	49,145	Amato (pen.), Kanchelskis, Wallace
2 May 1999	Celtic	A	3–0	59,918	McCann (2), Albertz (pen.)
9 May 1999	Heart of Midlothian	H	0–0	49,495	
15 May 1999	Motherwell	A	5–1	11,078	Amato (3, 1 (pen.)), van Bronckhorst, Kanchelskis
23 May 1999	Kilmarnock	H	1–1	48,835	Amato

=== Scottish League Cup ===
Date	Round	Opponent	Venue	Result	Attendance	Scorers
18 August 1998	R3	Alloa Athletic	H	4–0	37,201	Albertz(2), B.Ferguson, Amoruso
8 September 1998	QF	Ayr United	A	2–0	11,198	Miller, Amato
25 October 1998	SF	Airdrieonians	N	5–0	21,171	Johansson, Wallace (2), I.Ferguson, Durie
29 November 1998	F	St Johnstone	N	2–1	45,533	Guivarc'h, Albertz

=== Scottish Cup ===
Date	Round	Opponent	Venue	Result	Attendance	Scorers
23 January 1999	R3	Stenhousemuir	H	2–0	37,759	Guivarc'h, Wallace
14 February 1999	R4	Hamilton Academical	A	6–0	7,339	Johannson (2), Albertz(pen.), Vidmar, Kanchelskis, McCann
6 March 1999	QF	Falkirk	H	2–1	39,250	McCann, Amoruso
11 April 1999	SF	St Johnstone	N	4–0	20,664	Wallace, van Bronckhorst, Johansson, McCann
29 May 1999	F	Celtic	N	1–0	52,670	Wallace

=== UEFA Cup ===
Date	Round	Opponent	Venue	Result	Attendance	Scorers
22 July 1998	QR1	(Republic of Ireland) Shelbourne	N	5–3	6,047	Albertz (2 pens), Amato (2), van Bronckhorst
29 July 1998	QR1	(Republic of Ireland) Shelbourne	H	2–0	46,906	Johansson (2)
11 August 1998	QR2	(Greece) PAOK	H	2–0	35,392	Wallace, Kanchelskis
25 August 1998	QR2	(Greece) PAOK	A	0–0	30,388	
15 September 1998	R1	(Israel) Beitar Jerusalem	A	1–1	14,000	Albertz
1 October 1998	R1	(Israel) Beitar Jerusalem	H	4–2	45,610	Johansson, Wallace, Porrini, Gattuso
22 October 1998	R2	(Germany) Bayer Leverkusen	A	2–1	22,000	Johansson, van Bronckhorst
5 November 1998	R2	(Germany) Bayer Leverkusen	H	1–1	50,012	Johansson
24 November 1998	R3	(Italy) Parma	H	1–1	49,514	Wallace
8 December 1998	R3	(Italy) Parma	A	1–3	17,000	Albertz

== League table ==
Pos	Team	Pld	W	D	L	GF	GA	GD	Pts	Qualification or relegation
1	Rangers (C)	36	23	8	5	78	31	+47	77	Qualification for the Champions League second qualifying round
2	Celtic	36	21	8	7	84	35	+49	71	Qualification for the UEFA Cup qualifying round (Note: Since Rangers, the winners of the 1998–99 Scottish Cup, already qualified for the UEFA Champions League, Celtic, the losing finalist, earned a spot in the 1999–2000 UEFA Cup. As such, the league's UEFA Cup place moved down to third-placed St Johnstone. Scotland were also awarded an additional UEFA Cup place as the association was top of the UEFA Fair Play ranking. Kilmarnock earned this place as winners of the Scottish Fair Play ranking.)
3	St Johnstone	36	15	12	9	39	38	+1	57	Qualification for the UEFA Cup qualifying round
4	Kilmarnock	36	14	14	8	47	29	+18	56	Qualification for the UEFA Cup qualifying round
5	Dundee	36	13	7	16	36	56	−20	46	

Updated to match(es) played on end of season. Source: Soccerway and SPL official website
Rules for classification: 1) Points; 2) Goal difference; 3) Goals scored
(C) Champions
