= 1999–2000 Rangers F.C. season =

Rangers
1999–2000 season
- Chairman: David Murray
- Manager: Dick Advocaat
- Ground: Ibrox Stadium
- Scottish Premier League: 1st (champions)
- Scottish Cup: Winners
- League Cup: Quarter-finals
- Champions League: First group stage
- UEFA Cup: Third round
- Top goalscorer: League: Jörg Albertz; Rod Wallace (17 each); All: Rod Wallace (21 goals)
Home colours	Away colours	Third colours

The 1999–2000 season was the 120th season of competitive football by Rangers.

== Overview ==
Rangers played a total of 57 competitive matches during the 1999–2000 season. The team finished first in the Scottish Premier League and won Advocaat his second consecutive league title.

Rangers won the title by 21 points after some very consistent form throughout the season, only failing to win eight matches and losing just two. Rangers were undefeated against Celtic winning three out of the four matches. The signing of Michael Mols proved to be very significant, with the striker scoring nine goals in his first nine league matches, although he suffered a serious injury later on in the season.

In the domestic cup competitions, they were knocked out of the League Cup at the quarter-finals stage, losing 1–0 to Aberdeen. However, the team won the Scottish Cup, their 100th major honour, defeating Aberdeen 4–0.

In European competition, the team qualified for the UEFA Champions League group stages after a win over UEFA Cup holders Parma in the third qualifying round, whom Rangers has lost to the previous season en route to Parma's UEFA Cup win. They were drawn alongside Bayern Munich, PSV Eindhoven and Valencia. Rangers were unable to qualify for the next stage of the Champions League after a narrow 1–0 loss in Munich on the final match day. The game saw Michael Mols suffer a serious knee injury after attempting to avoid a collision with Oliver Khan, and he was therefore out for the rest of the season. Rangers finished third in the group and dropped into the UEFA Cup, where they drew Borussia Dortmund. Despite a convincing 2–0 win in Glasgow, Rangers lost 2–0 in Dortmund and lost the tie overall after a penalty shoot-out.

== Transfers ==
=== In ===
Date	Player	From	Fee
25 June 1999	(Poland) Dariusz Adamczuk	(Scotland) Dundee	Free
27 June 1999	(Netherlands) Michael Mols	(Netherlands) Utrecht	£4,000,000
16 November 1999	(Finland) Tero Penttilä	(Finland) Haka	£300,000
23 November 1999	(Norway) Thomas Myhre	(England) Everton	Loan
4 December 1999	(Scotland) Billy Dodds	(Scotland) Dundee United	£1,300,000
5 January 2000	(Turkey) Tugay Kerimoğlu	(Turkey) Galatasaray	£1,300,000

=== Out ===
Date	Player	To	Fee
1 June 1999	(Netherlands) Theo Snelders	(Netherlands) MVV	Free
1 June 1999	(Sweden) Jonas Thern	Retired	
1 June 1999	(Italy) Luigi Riccio	(Belgium) K.S.K. Beveren	Free
4 June 1999	(France) Stephane Guivarc'h	(France) Auxerre	£3,400,000
29 September 1999	(Scotland) Charlie Miller	(England) Watford	£350,000
17 December 1999	(Finland) Antti Niemi	(Scotland) Heart of Midlothian	£350,000
23 December 1999	(Scotland) Derek McInnes	(France) Toulouse	£400,000
11 January 2000	(Scotland) Ian Ferguson	(Scotland) Dunfermline Athletic	Free
4 February 2000	(Argentina) Gabriel Amato	(Brazil) Grêmio	£3,500,000
24 February 2000	(Scotland) Colin Hendry	(England) Coventry City	£750,000
2 March 2000	(Romania) Daniel Prodan	(Romania) Steaua București	Loan
31 March 2000	(Northern Ireland) Paul McKnight	(Scotland) St Mirren	Nominal

- Expenditure: ▼£6,900,000
- Income: ▲£8,750,000
- Total loss/gain: ▲£1,850,000

== Matches ==
All results are written with Rangers' score first.

=== Scottish Premier League ===
Date	Opponent	Venue	Result	Attendance	Scorers
31 July 1999	Kilmarnock	H	2–1	48,074	Wallace, Reyna
7 August 1999	Heart of Midlothian	A	4–0	17,893	Reyna (2), Mols, Albertz
15 August 1999	Motherwell	H	4–1	45,264	Mols (4)
21 August 1999	Dundee United	H	4–1	48,849	Reyna, Van Bronckhorst, Wallace, Vidmar
28 August 1999	Hibernian	A	1–0	15,587	Johansson
11 September 1999	Aberdeen	H	3–0	49,226	Mols (2), Albertz (pen.)
25 September 1999	St Johnstone	H	3–1	47,475	Albertz (2, 1 pen.), Mols
2 October 1999	Dundee	A	3–2	10,494	Kanchelskis, Wallace, Amato
16 October 1999	Kilmarnock	A	1–1	15,795	Van Bronckhorst
30 October 1999	Aberdeen	A	5–1	16,846	Johansson (3), Mols, Amato
7 November 1999	Celtic	H	4–2	50,026	Johansson, Albertz (pen.), Amoruso, Amato
20 November 1999	Hibernian	H	2–0	49,544	Johansson, Albertz
28 November 1999	Dundee	H	1–2	47,154	Wallace
11 December 1999	Kilmarnock	H	1–0	47,169	Albertz
18 December 1999	Motherwell	A	5–1	12,640	Kanchelskis (2), Amoruso, Dodds (2)
22 December 1999	Heart of Midlothian	H	1–0	49,907	Albertz
27 December 1999	Celtic	A	1–1	59,619	Dodds
22 January 2000	Aberdeen	H	5–0	50,023	Moore, Van Bronckhorst, Numan, Wallace, Ferguson
2 February 2000	Dundee United	A	4–0	11,241	Vidmar (2), Wallace, McCann
6 February 2000	Hibernian	A	2–2	13,420	Wallace, McCann
15 February 2000	St Johnstone	A	1–1	9,608	Vidmar
27 February 2000	Dundee	A	7–1	9,297	Wallace (3), Vidmar (2), Albertz, Rozental
4 March 2000	St Johnstone	H	0–0	49,907	
8 March 2000	Celtic	A	1–0	59,220	Wallace
18 March 2000	Motherwell	H	6–2	49,622	Wallace (3), Rozental (pen.), Albertz, Tugay (pen.)
26 March 2000	Celtic	H	4–0	50,039	Albertz (2), Kanchelskis, Van Bronckhorst
1 April 2000	Aberdeen	A	1–1	16,521	Ferguson
4 April 2000	Dundee United	H	3–0	45,829	Albertz, Dodds, Wallace
12 April 2000	Heart of Midlothian	A	2–1	16,314	Wallace, Dodds
15 April 2000	Dundee United	A	2–0	11,419	Ferguson, Albertz
23 April 2000	St Johnstone	A	2–0	10,016	Dodds (2)
30 April 2000	Dundee	H	3–0	50,032	Dodds, McCann, Rozental
3 May 2000	Hibernian	H	5–2	39,349	Ferguson, Dennis (o.g.), Dodds, Albertz (2)
7 May 2000	Kilmarnock	A	2–0	13,284	Reyna, Albertz
13 May 2000	Heart of Midlothian	H	1–0	50,009	Dodds
21 May 2000	Motherwell	A	0–2	12,310	

=== Scottish League Cup ===
Date	Round	Opponent	Venue	Result	Attendance	Scorers
12 October 1999	R3	Dunfermline Athletic	H	1–0	30,024	Wallace
1 December 1999	QF	Aberdeen	A	0–1	12,108	

=== Scottish Cup ===
Date	Round	Opponent	Venue	Result	Attendance	Scorers
30 January 2000	R3	St Johnstone	A	2–0	9,099	Numan, Van Bronckhorst
19 February 2000	R4	Greenock Morton	A	1–0	8,600	Moore
12 March 2000	QF	Heart of Midlothian	H	4–1	31,864	Ferguson, Numan, Amoruso, Dodds (pen.)
8 April 2000	SF	Ayr United	N	7–0	38,357	Rozental (2), Kanchelskis, Wallace, Dodds (3)
27 May 2000	F	Aberdeen	N	4–0	50,865	Van Bronckhorst, Vidmar, Dodds, Albertz

=== UEFA Champions League ===
Date	Round	Opponent	Venue	Result	Attendance	Scorers
28 July 1999	QR2	(Finland) Haka	A	4–1	3,341	Amoruso, Mols (2), Johansson
4 August 1999	QR2	(Finland) Haka	H	3–0	46,443	Wallace, Johansson, Amato
11 August 1999	QR3	(Italy) Parma	H	2–0	49,263	Vidmar, Reyna
25 August 1999	QR3	(Italy) Parma	A	0–1	24,087	
15 September 1999	GS	(Spain) Valencia	A	0–2	54,971	
21 September 1999	GS	(Germany) Bayern Munich	H	1–1	49,960	Albertz
28 September 1999	GS	(Netherlands) PSV Eindhoven	A	1–0	30,000	Albertz
20 October 1999	GS	(Netherlands) PSV Eindhoven	H	4–1	50,083	Amoruso, Mols (2), McCann
26 October 1999	GS	(Spain) Valencia	H	1–2	50,063	Moore
3 November 1999	GS	(Germany) Bayern Munich	A	0–1	54,000	

=== UEFA Cup ===
Date	Round	Opponent	Venue	Result	Attendance	Scorers
25 November 1999	R3	(Germany) Borussia Dortmund	H	2–0	49,268	Kohler (o.g.), Wallace
7 December 1999	R3	(Germany) Borussia Dortmund	A	0–2*	38,000	

*Rangers lost the tie 3–1 on penalties

== Appearances ==
List of squad players, including number of appearances by competition

No.	Pos	Nat	Player	Total		Premier League		FA Cup		League Cup		Other	
No.	Pos	Nat	Player	Apps	Goals	Apps	Goals	Apps	Goals	Apps	Goals	Apps	Goals
1	GK	(Germany) GER	Stefan Klos	35	0	24	0	5	0	0	0	6	0
2	DF	(Italy) ITA	Sergio Porrini	22	0	11+1	0	0+1	0	0+1	0	8	0
3	DF	(Australia) AUS	Craig Moore	39	3	22	1	4	1	1	0	12	1
4	DF	(Italy) ITA	Lorenzo Amoruso	46	5	30	2	3	1	2	0	11	2
5	DF	(Netherlands) NED	Arthur Numan	43	3	29+1	1	5	2	1	0	7	0
6	MF	(Scotland) SCO	Barry Ferguson	49	5	31	4	5	1	1	0	12	0
7	MF	(Russia) RUS	Andrei Kanchelskis	40	5	25+3	4	4+1	1	2	0	0+5	0
8	MF	(Netherlands) NED	Giovanni van Bronckhorst	45	6	27	4	5	2	1	0	12	0
9	FW	(Netherlands) NED	Michael Mols	20	13	9	9	0	0	0+1	0	10	4
10	FW	(England) ENG	Rod Wallace	44	20	25+3	16	5	1	1	1	10	2
11	MF	(Germany) GER	Jörg Albertz	53	20	30+5	17	4+1	1	1	0	5+7	2
12	MF	(United States) USA	Claudio Reyna	42	6	25+4	5	3+1	0	0	0	9	1
13	GK	(Finland) FIN	Antti Niemi	1	0	1	0	0	0	0	0	0	0
14	DF	(Australia) AUS	Tony Vidmar	39	6	21+6	4	3	1	1	0	6+2	1
15	FW	(Argentina) ARG	Gabriel Amato	13	4	4+4	3	0	0	1	0	2+2	1
15	FW	(Chile) CHI	Sebastian Rozental	13	5	6+5	3	2	2	0	0	0	0
16	DF	(Scotland) SCO	Colin Hendry	4	0	1+1	0	0	0	0	0	0+2	0
17	DF	(Poland) POL	Dariusz Adamczuk	16	0	5+5	0	0	0	1	0	5	0
18	MF	(Scotland) SCO	Neil McCann	47	4	12+18	3	2+3	0	1	0	7+4	1
19	DF	(Scotland) SCO	Scott Wilson	12	0	9	0	1+1	0	1	0	0	0
20	FW	(Finland) FIN	Jonatan Johansson	26	7	8+8	6	0	0	2	0	2+6	1
21	FW	(Italy) ITA	Marco Negri	1	0	0	0	0+1	0	0	0	0	0
22	GK	(France) FRA	Lionel Charbonnier	11	0	7	0	0	0	0	0	4	0
23	MF	(Scotland) SCO	Barry Nicholson	5	1	0+2	0	0	0	1	0	0+2	1
24	FW	(Scotland) SCO	Gordon Durie	11	0	1+6	0	2	0	1	0	0+1	0
26	MF	(Scotland) SCO	Ian Ferguson	3	0	0+2	0	0	0	0+1	0	0	0
26	MF	(Turkey) TUR	Tugay Kerimoğlu (from 22 January)	20	1	9+7	1	1+3	0	0	0	0	0
27	MF	(Scotland) SCO	Derek McInnes	4	0	0+1	0	0	0	1	0	2	0
29	DF	(Finland) FIN	Tero Penttilä	4	0	3	0	0	0	0+1	0	0	0
32	GK	(Scotland) SCO	Mark Brown	2	0	1	0	0	0	1	0	0	0
33	DF	(Scotland) SCO	Bob Malcolm	3	0	1+2	0	0	0	0	0	0	0
34	DF	(Scotland) SCO	Maurice Ross	1	0	0+1	0	0	0	0	0	0	0
41	MF	(Scotland) SCO	Jimmy Gibson	1	0	0+1	0	0	0	0	0	0	0
44	MF	(Northern Ireland) NIR	Stephen Carson	1	0	0	0	0	0	0+1	0	0	0
46	GK	(Norway) NOR	Thomas Myhre	6	0	3	0	0	0	1	0	2	0
47	FW	(Scotland) SCO	Billy Dodds	21	15	16+2	10	1+2	5	0	0	0	0
48	MF	(Scotland) SCO	Stephen Hughes	1	0	0+1	0	0	0	0	0	0	0

== Competitions ==
=== Overall ===
Competition	First match	Last match	Starting round	Final position	Record							
Competition	First match	Last match	Starting round	Final position	Pld	W	D	L	GF	GA	GD	Win %
Scottish Premier League	31 July	21 May		Winners	36	28	6	2	96	26	+70	77.78
UEFA Champions League	28 July	3 November	Second Qualifying round	Group Stage	10	5	1	4	16	9	+7	50.00
UEFA Cup	25 November	7 December	Third round	Third round	2	1	0	1	2	2	+0	50.00
Scottish Cup	30 January	27 May	Third round	Winners	5	5	0	0	18	1	+17	100.00
League Cup	12 October	1 December	Third round	Quarter-finals	2	1	0	1	1	1	+0	50.00
Total					55	40	7	8	133	39	+94	72.73

Source: Competitions

=== League table ===
Pos	Team	Pld	W	D	L	GF	GA	GD	Pts	Qualification or relegation
1	Rangers (C)	36	28	6	2	96	26	+70	90	Qualification for the Champions League second qualifying round
2	Celtic	36	21	6	9	90	38	+52	69	Qualification for the UEFA Cup qualifying round
3	Heart of Midlothian	36	15	9	12	47	40	+7	54	Qualification for the UEFA Cup qualifying round
4	Motherwell	36	14	10	12	49	63	−14	52	
5	St Johnstone	36	10	12	14	36	44	−8	42	

Updated to match(es) played on end of season. Source: Scottish Professional Football League
Rules for classification: 1) Points; 2) Goal difference; 3) Goals scored
(C) Champions

=== Champions League table ===
Pos	Team	Pld	W	D	L	GF	GA	GD	Pts	Qualification	VAL	BAY	RAN	PSV
1	(Spain) Valencia	6	3	3	0	8	4	+4	12	Advance to second group stage	—	1–1	2–0	1–0
2	(Germany) Bayern Munich	6	2	3	1	7	6	+1	9	Advance to second group stage	1–1	—	1–0	2–1
3	(Scotland) Rangers	6	2	1	3	7	7	0	7	Transfer to UEFA Cup	1–2	1–1	—	4–1
4	(Netherlands) PSV Eindhoven	6	1	1	4	5	10	−5	4		1–1	2–1	0–1	—

Source: UEFA
