= 2000–01 Rangers F.C. season =

Rangers
2000–01 season
- Chairman: David Murray
- Manager: Dick Advocaat
- Ground: Ibrox Stadium
- Scottish Premier League: 2nd
- Scottish Cup: Quarter-finals
- League Cup: Semi-finals
- Champions League: Group stage
- UEFA Cup: Third round
- Top goalscorer: League: Tore André Flo (11); All: Jorg Albertz (15)
| Home colours | Away colours | Third colours |

The 2000–01 season was the 121st season of competitive football by Rangers.

== Overview ==
Rangers played a total of 56 competitive matches during the 2000–01 season.

Rangers went into the season looking to clinch a third consecutive Scottish Premier League title, as well as trying to successfully defend the Scottish Cup, win the League Cup and make an impact in the UEFA Champions League. Despite further heavy investment in the team, which included paying a £12 million fee for striker Tore André Flo in November, Rangers were unable to win the title and finished the season without winning any trophies.

Despite a good start to the season, a 6–2 loss against Celtic in the first Old Firm derby saw the beginning of inconsistent league form for Rangers throughout the rest of the season, including a 3–0 loss at home to Kilmarnock. The loss to Kilmarnock brought a conflict between club captain Lorenzo Amoruso and manager Dick Advocaat to a head, resulting in Amoruso being stripped of the captaincy and 22-year-old Barry Ferguson being given the arm band. A 5–1 victory over Celtic in November gave hope for revival but Rangers were unable to put up any serious challenge and finished the season 15 points off top spot.

In the domestic cup competitions Rangers lost 3–1 to Celtic in the semi-finals of the League Cup and also surrendered their Scottish Cup crown with a 1–0 loss away to Dundee Utd.

In Europe, Rangers qualified for the group stages of the UEFA Champions League for the second consecutive time after two qualifying rounds and were drawn alongside Sturm Graz, Galatasaray and Monaco. Rangers made a good start to the group with six points from two matches, including a 5–0 win at home to Sturm Graz and 1–0 win away to Monaco. However, they only picked up two points from the remaining four games and failed to qualify for the next phase of the competition, finishing third and therefore dropping into the UEFA Cup. The last match at home to Monaco saw Rangers leading 2-1 which would have seen them go through but a late Monaco goal denied Rangers a place in the next round. In the UEFA Cup, Rangers drew Kaiserslautern and, despite winning the first leg 1–0 at home, they exited European competition before Christmas after a 3–0 loss in Germany.

== Transfers ==
=== In ===
| Date | Player | From | Fee |
|---|---|---|---|
| 5 June 2000 | (Netherlands) Bert Konterman | (Netherlands) Feyenoord | £4,500,000 |
| 6 June 2000 | (Scotland) Paul Ritchie | (Scotland) Heart of Midlothian | Free |
| 8 June 2000 | (Denmark) Peter Løvenkrands | (Denmark) AB | £1,400,000 |
| 26 June 2000 | (Scotland) Kenny Miller | (Scotland) Hibernian | £2,000,000 |
| 30 June 2000 | (England) Paul Reid | (England) Carlisle United | £600,000 |
| 1 July 2000 | (Scotland) Allan Johnston | (England) Sunderland | Free |
| 1 July 2000 | (Netherlands) Fernando Ricksen | (Netherlands) AZ | £3,750,000 |
| 31 August 2000 | (Netherlands) Ronald de Boer | (Spain) Barcelona | £4,500,000 |
| 6 September 2000 | (Austria) Alexander Hauser | (Austria) Tirol Innsbruck | Free |
| 21 October 2000 | (Denmark) Jesper Christiansen | (Denmark) OB | £1,700,000 |
| 23 November 2000 | (Norway) Tore André Flo | (England) Chelsea | £12,000,000 |
| 1 January 2001 | (Finland) Jani Kauppila | (Finland) Tervarit | Free |
| 8 March 2001 | (Jamaica) Marcus Gayle | (England) Wimbledon | £900,000 |
| 14 March 2001 | (France) Fabrice Fernandes | (France) Rennes | Loan |

=== Out ===
| Date | Player | To | Fee |
|---|---|---|---|
| 31 May 2000 | (Norway) Ståle Stensaas | (Norway) Rosenborg | £300,000 |
| 31 May 2000 | (Scotland) Gordon Durie | (Scotland) Heart of Midlothian | Free |
| 14 June 2000 | (Northern Ireland) Darren Fitzgerald | (Northern Ireland) Glentoran | Free |
| 27 July 2000 | (Scotland) Scott Chaplain | (Scotland) Ayr United | Free |
| 31 July 2000 | (Finland) Jonatan Johansson | (England) Charlton Athletic | £3,500,000 |
| 1 August 2000 | (Scotland) Barry Nicholson | (Scotland) Dunfermline Athletic | £200,000 |
| 10 August 2000 | (Chile) Sebastian Rozental | (Argentina) Independiente | Loan |
| 21 August 2000 | (Scotland) Paul Ritchie | (England) Manchester City | £500,000 |
| 7 September 2000 | (Scotland) Michael Stone | (England) Doncaster Rovers | Free |
| 19 November 2000 | (France) Lionel Charbonnier | (Switzerland) Lausanne-Sport | Free |
| 29 January 2001 | (Russia) Andrei Kanchelskis | (England) Manchester City | Loan |
| 1 February 2001 | (Romania) Daniel Prodan | (Romania) Rocar București | Free |
| 9 February 2001 | (Italy) Marco Negri | (Italy) Bologna | Free |

- Expendure: ▼£31,350,000
- Income: ▲£4,500,000
- Total loss/gain: ▼£26,850,000

== Matches ==
All results are written with Rangers' score first.

=== Friendlies ===
| Date | Opponent | Venue | Result | Attendance | Scorers |
|---|---|---|---|---|---|
| 7 July 2000 | Gent | A | 3–2 | 2,500 | Kanchelskis (2), McCann |
| 12 July 2000 | Bocholt | A | 3–1 | 3,000 | Mols, Wallace, Albertz |
| 13 July 2000 | Quick '20 | A | 6–0 | 2,000 | Ferguson (2), Johansson (2), Mols, Miller |
| 15 July 2000 | HZVV | A | 5–1 | 3,000 | Dodds (2), Albertz (2) Kanchelskis |
| 20 January 2001 | Miami Fusion | A | 4–1 | 3,000 | Miller (4) |

=== Scottish Premier League ===
| Date | Opponent | Venue | Result | Attendance | Scorers |
|---|---|---|---|---|---|
| 29 July 2000 | St Johnstone | H | 2–1 | 48,062 | Dodds (2) |
| 5 August 2000 | Kilmarnock | A | 4–2 | 14,680 | Dodds (2, 1 pen.), Miller, Tugay |
| 13 August 2000 | St Mirren | A | 3–1 | 9,251 | Albertz (2, 1 pen.), Dodds |
| 19 August 2000 | Dunfermline Athletic | H | 4–1 | 47,452 | Albertz (pen.), van Bronckhorst, Dodds, Wallace |
| 27 August 2000 | Celtic | A | 2–6 | 59,476 | Reyna, Dodds (pen.) |
| 9 September 2000 | Dundee | A | 1–1 | 10,439 | McCann |
| 17 September 2000 | Hearts | H | 1–0 | 47,496 | de Boer |
| 23 September 2000 | Motherwell | A | 1–0 | 11,275 | Mols |
| 1 October 2000 | Dundee United | H | 3–0 | 44,324 | Kanchelskis, Albertz, van Bronckhorst |
| 14 October 2000 | Hibernian | A | 0–1 | 14,524 | |
| 22 October 2000 | St Johnstone | A | 1–2 | 7,763 | Miller |
| 28 October 2000 | Kilmarnock | H | 0–3 | 49,659 | |
| 4 November 2000 | St Mirren | H | 7–1 | 48,795 | Miller (5), Dodds, McCann |
| 12 November 2000 | Aberdeen | A | 2–1 | 16,798 | Miller, Mols |
| 18 November 2000 | Dunfermline Athletic | A | 0–0 | 10,706 | |
| 26 November 2000 | Celtic | H | 5–1 | 50,083 | Ferguson, Flo, de Boer, Amoruso, Mols |
| 3 December 2000 | Hearts | A | 1–0 | 16,710 | Albertz (pen.) |
| 10 December 2000 | Motherwell | H | 2–0 | 46,058 | Konterman, Ferguson |
| 13 December 2000 | Aberdeen | H | 3–1 | 45,285 | Mols, Dodds, Albertz |
| 17 December 2000 | Dundee United | A | 1–1 | 10,750 | Reyna |
| 23 December 2000 | Hibernian | H | 1–0 | 49,993 | de Boer |
| 26 December 2000 | St Johnstone | H | 3–0 | 46,180 | McCann, Ricksen, Flo |
| 2 January 2001 | St Mirren | A | 3–1 | 8,142 | Flo (2), Konterman |
| 31 January 2001 | Aberdeen | H | 1–0 | 45,621 | Tugay |
| 2 February 2001 | Dunfermline Athletic | H | 2–0 | 46,302 | Tugay, Mols |
| 11 February 2001 | Celtic | A | 0–1 | 59,496 | |
| 24 February 2001 | Dundee | A | 1–0 | 9,778 | Konterman |
| 3 March 2001 | Hearts | H | 2–0 | 49,003 | Flo (2) |
| 14 March 2001 | Dundee | H | 0–2 | 45,035 | |
| 17 March 2001 | Motherwell | A | 2–1 | 11,208 | Fernandes, Malcolm |
| 31 March 2001 | Dundee United | H | 0–2 | 48,382 | |
| 8 April 2001 | Hibernian | A | 0–0 | 9,704 | |
| 11 April 2001 | Kilmarnock | A | 2–1 | 14,585 | Flo (2) |
| 21 April 2001 | Dundee | A | 3–0 | 10,687 | Wallace, Flo, Albertz |
| 29 April 2001 | Celtic | H | 0–3 | 50,057 | |
| 8 May 2001 | Hearts | A | 4–1 | 15,315 | Albertz (2), Wallace, Flo |
| 11 May 2001 | Kilmarnock | H | 5–1 | 46,577 | Wallace (2), de Boer, Amoruso, Flo |
| 20 May 2001 | Hibernian | H | 4–0 | 47,023 | de Boer (2), Albertz (pen.), Vidmar |

=== Scottish League Cup ===
| Date | Round | Opponent | Venue | Result | Attendance | Scorers |
|---|---|---|---|---|---|---|
| 6 September 2000 | R3 | Aberdeen | H | 4–2 | 37,029 | van Bronckhorst, Wallace, Dodds, Amoruso |
| 31 October 2000 | QF | Dundee United | H | 2–0 | 30,966 | Miller, Ferguson |
| 7 February 2001 | SF | Celtic | N | 1–3 | 50,019 | Albertz (pen.) |

=== Scottish Cup ===
| Date | Round | Opponent | Venue | Result | Attendance | Scorers |
|---|---|---|---|---|---|---|
| 27 January 2001 | R3 | Brechin City | H | 2–0 | 22,606 | Johnston, Miller |
| 18 February 2001 | R4 | Ross County | A | 3–2 | 5,972 | Flo (2), Ferguson |
| 11 March 2001 | QF | Dundee United | A | 0–1 | 11,793 | |

=== UEFA Champions League ===
| Date | Round | Opponent | Venue | Result | Attendance | Scorers |
|---|---|---|---|---|---|---|
| 26 July 2000 | QR2 | (Lithuania) Žalgiris Kaunas | H | 4–1 | 45,974 | Johnston, Albertz (pen), Dodds (2) |
| 2 August 2000 | QR2 | (Lithuania) Žalgiris Kaunas | A | 0–0 | 4,000 | |
| 9 August 2000 | QR3 | (Denmark) Herfølge | A | 3–0 | 3,523 | Albertz, Wallace, Amoruso |
| 23 August 2000 | QR3 | (Denmark) Herfølge | H | 3–0 | 34,141 | Wallace, Johnston, Kanchelskis |
| 12 September 2000 | GS | (Austria) Sturm Graz | H | 5–0 | 49,317 | Mols, de Boer, Albertz, van Bronckhorst, Dodds |
| 20 September 2000 | GS | (France) Monaco | A | 1–0 | 11,161 | van Bronckhorst |
| 27 September 2000 | GS | (Turkey) Galatasaray | A | 2–3 | 20,954 | Kanchelskis, van Bronckhorst |
| 17 October 2000 | GS | (Turkey) Galatasaray | H | 0–0 | 49,603 | |
| 25 October 2000 | GS | (Austria) Sturm Graz | A | 0–2 | 15,400 | |
| 7 November 2000 | GS | (France) Monaco | H | 2–2 | 50,228 | Miller, Mols |

=== UEFA Cup ===
| Date | Round | Opponent | Venue | Result | Attendance | Scorers |
|---|---|---|---|---|---|---|
| 30 November 2000 | R3 | (Germany) Kaiserslautern | H | 1–0 | 47,279 | Albertz |
| 7 December 2000 | R3 | (Germany) Kaiserslautern | A | 0–3 | 28,757 | |

== Appearances ==
List of squad players, including number of appearances by competition

| No. | Pos | Nat | Player | Total | | League | | Cup | | League Cup | | Europe | |
| No. | Pos | Nat | Player | Apps | Goals | Apps | Goals | Apps | Goals | Apps | Goals | Apps | Goals |
|---|---|---|---|---|---|---|---|---|---|---|---|---|---|
| 1 | GK | (Germany) GER | Stefan Klos | 47 | 0 | 32 | 0 | 3 | 0 | 2 | 0 | 10 | 0 |
| 2 | DF | (Netherlands) NED | Fernando Ricksen | 37 | 1 | 26+1 | 1 | 3 | 0 | 2 | 0 | 5 | 0 |
| 3 | DF | (Australia) AUS | Craig Moore | 7 | 0 | 5 | 0 | 1 | 0 | 0 | 0 | 1 | 0 |
| 4 | DF | (Italy) ITA | Lorenzo Amoruso | 42 | 4 | 29 | 2 | 1 | 0 | 2 | 1 | 10 | 1 |
| 5 | DF | (Netherlands) NED | Arthur Numan | 33 | 0 | 22 | 0 | 1 | 0 | 3 | 0 | 7 | 0 |
| 6 | MF | (Scotland) SCO | Barry Ferguson | 47 | 4 | 30 | 2 | 3 | 1 | 3 | 1 | 11 | 0 |
| 7 | MF | (Russia) RUS | Andrei Kanchelskis | 14 | 3 | 3+4 | 1 | 0 | 0 | 0 | 0 | 2+5 | 2 |
| 8 | MF | (Netherlands) NED | Giovanni van Bronckhorst | 19 | 6 | 10+1 | 2 | 0 | 0 | 1 | 1 | 7 | 3 |
| 9 | FW | (Netherlands) NED | Michael Mols | 21 | 7 | 10+3 | 5 | 0+1 | 0 | 0+1 | 0 | 5+1 | 2 |
| 10 | FW | (England) ENG | Rod Wallace | 25 | 8 | 14+1 | 5 | 0+1 | 0 | 1 | 1 | 6+2 | 2 |
| 11 | MF | (Germany) GER | Jörg Albertz | 34 | 15 | 20+4 | 10 | 1 | 0 | 1 | 1 | 8 | 4 |
| 12 | MF | (United States) USA | Claudio Reyna | 31 | 2 | 16+2 | 2 | 2 | 0 | 1 | 0 | 10 | 0 |
| 14 | MF | (Netherlands) NED | Ronald de Boer | 26 | 7 | 17 | 6 | 1 | 0 | 1 | 0 | 7 | 1 |
| 15 | DF | (Netherlands) NED | Bert Konterman | 51 | 3 | 36+1 | 3 | 3 | 0 | 1 | 0 | 10 | 0 |
| 16 | FW | (Scotland) SCO | Billy Dodds | 41 | 13 | 16+14 | 9 | 1 | 0 | 2 | 1 | 3+5 | 3 |
| 17 | MF | (Turkey) TUR | Tugay Kerimoğlu | 38 | 3 | 17+9 | 3 | 1+1 | 0 | 2+1 | 0 | 6+1 | 0 |
| 18 | MF | (Scotland) SCO | Neil McCann | 35 | 3 | 16+5 | 3 | 1 | 0 | 3 | 0 | 2+8 | 0 |
| 19 | DF | (Scotland) SCO | Scott Wilson | 30 | 0 | 19+1 | 0 | 2 | 0 | 3 | 0 | 4+1 | 0 |
| 20 | FW | (Finland) FIN | Jonatan Johansson | 1 | 0 | 0 | 0 | 0 | 0 | 0 | 0 | 1 | 0 |
| 20 | GK | (Denmark) DEN | Jesper Christiansen (from 21 October) | 6 | 0 | 3 | 0 | 0 | 0 | 1 | 0 | 2 | 0 |
| 21 | DF | (Italy) ITA | Sergio Porrini | 18 | 0 | 12 | 0 | 1 | 0 | 1 | 0 | 3+1 | 0 |
| 22 | FW | (Norway) NOR | Tore André Flo | 22 | 13 | 18+1 | 11 | 2 | 2 | 1 | 0 | 0 | 0 |
| 23 | FW | (Scotland) SCO | Kenny Miller | 35 | 11 | 12+15 | 8 | 2+1 | 1 | 1 | 1 | 3+1 | 1 |
| 24 | MF | (Scotland) SCO | Allan Johnston | 25 | 3 | 9+4 | 0 | 2+1 | 1 | 0+2 | 0 | 4+3 | 2 |
| 25 | DF | (Australia) AUS | Tony Vidmar | 22 | 1 | 11+4 | 1 | 1 | 0 | 0 | 0 | 4+2 | 0 |
| 26 | FW | (Denmark) DEN | Peter Løvenkrands | 10 | 0 | 1+7 | 0 | 0 | 0 | 0+1 | 0 | 1 | 0 |
| 27 | DF | (Scotland) SCO | Paul Ritchie | 0 | 0 | 0 | 0 | 0 | 0 | 0 | 0 | 0 | 0 |
| 28 | DF | (Poland) POL | Dariusz Adamczuk | 3 | 0 | 1+2 | 0 | 0 | 0 | 0 | 0 | 0 | 0 |
| 29 | DF | (Finland) FIN | Tero Penttilä | 0 | 0 | 0 | 0 | 0 | 0 | 0 | 0 | 0 | 0 |
| 30 | GK | (France) FRA | Lionel Charbonnier | 0 | 0 | 0 | 0 | 0 | 0 | 0 | 0 | 0 | 0 |
| 31 | FW | (Jamaica) JAM | Marcus Gayle | 4 | 0 | 4 | 0 | 0 | 0 | 0 | 0 | 0 | 0 |
| 32 | GK | (Scotland) SCO | Mark Brown | 3 | 0 | 3 | 0 | 0 | 0 | 0 | 0 | 0 | 0 |
| 33 | DF | (Scotland) SCO | Bob Malcolm | 9 | 1 | 3+3 | 1 | 1+1 | 0 | 1 | 0 | 0 | 0 |
| 34 | FW | (Scotland) SCO | Gordon Durie | 0 | 0 | 0 | 0 | 0 | 0 | 0 | 0 | 0 | 0 |
| 35 | FW | (Italy) ITA | Marco Negri | 2 | 0 | 1 | 0 | 0 | 0 | 0 | 0 | 0+1 | 0 |
| 35 | MF | (Finland) FIN | Jani Kauppila (from 1 January) | 4 | 0 | 1+3 | 0 | 0 | 0 | 0 | 0 | 0 | 0 |
| 38 | DF | (Romania) ROU | Daniel Prodan | 0 | 0 | 0 | 0 | 0 | 0 | 0 | 0 | 0 | 0 |
| 40 | MF | (France) FRA | Fabrice Fernandes | 4 | 1 | 0+4 | 1 | 0 | 0 | 0 | 0 | 0 | 0 |
| 41 | MF | (Scotland) SCO | Jimmy Gibson | 0 | 0 | 0 | 0 | 0 | 0 | 0 | 0 | 0 | 0 |
| 44 | DF | (Scotland) SCO | Maurice Ross | 1 | 0 | 0+1 | 0 | 0 | 0 | 0 | 0 | 0 | 0 |
| 45 | MF | (Northern Ireland) NIR | Stephen Carson | 3 | 0 | 1+1 | 0 | 0+1 | 0 | 0 | 0 | 0 | 0 |
| 48 | MF | (Scotland) SCO | Stephen Hughes | 1 | 0 | 0+1 | 0 | 0 | 0 | 0 | 0 | 0 | 0 |

== Competitions ==
=== Overall ===
| Competition | First match | Last match | Starting round | Final position | Record | | | | | | | |
| Competition | First match | Last match | Starting round | Final position | Pld | W | D | L | GF | GA | GD | Win % |
|---|---|---|---|---|---|---|---|---|---|---|---|---|
| Scottish Premier League | 29 July | 20 May | Matchday 1 | 2nd | 38 | 26 | 4 | 8 | 76 | 36 | +40 | 68.42 |
| UEFA Champions League | 26 July | 7 November | Second Qualifying round | Group Stage | 10 | 5 | 3 | 2 | 20 | 8 | +12 | 50.00 |
| UEFA Cup | 30 November | 7 December | Third round | Third round | 2 | 1 | 0 | 1 | 1 | 3 | −2 | 50.00 |
| Scottish Cup | 20 January | 11 March | Fourth round | Quarter Final | 3 | 2 | 0 | 1 | 5 | 3 | +2 | 66.67 |
| League Cup | 6 September | 7 February | Second round | Semi Final | 3 | 2 | 0 | 1 | 7 | 5 | +2 | 66.67 |
| Total | | | | | 56 | 36 | 7 | 13 | 109 | 55 | +54 | 64.29 |

Source: Competitions

=== League table ===
| Pos | Team | Pld | W | D | L | GF | GA | GD | Pts | Qualification or relegation (Note: Teams played each other three times (33 matches), before the league split into two groups (the top six and the bottom six) for the last five matches.) |
|---|---|---|---|---|---|---|---|---|---|---|
| 1 | Celtic (C) | 38 | 31 | 4 | 3 | 90 | 29 | +61 | 97 | Qualification for the Champions League third qualifying round |
| 2 | Rangers | 38 | 26 | 4 | 8 | 76 | 36 | +40 | 82 | Qualification for the Champions League second qualifying round |
| 3 | Hibernian | 38 | 18 | 12 | 8 | 57 | 35 | +22 | 66 | Qualification for the UEFA Cup first round |
| 4 | Kilmarnock | 38 | 15 | 9 | 14 | 44 | 53 | −9 | 54 | Qualification for the UEFA Cup qualifying round (Note: As both finalists of the 2000–01 Scottish Cup, Celtic and Hibernian, qualified for European competition via their league position, the cup berth for 2001–02 UEFA Cup was passed to the next-placed team in the league, fourth-placed Kilmarnock.) |
| 5 | Heart of Midlothian | 38 | 14 | 10 | 14 | 56 | 50 | +6 | 52 | |

Source: Scottish Professional Football League
Rules for classification: 1) Points; 2) Goal difference; 3) Goals scored
(C) Champions

=== Champions League table ===
| Pos | Team | Pld | W | D | L | GF | GA | GD | Pts | Qualification | STM | GAL | RAN | MON |
|---|---|---|---|---|---|---|---|---|---|---|---|---|---|---|
| 1 | (Austria) Sturm Graz | 6 | 3 | 1 | 2 | 9 | 12 | −3 | 10 | Advance to second group stage | — | 3–0 | 2–0 | 2–0 |
| 2 | (Turkey) Galatasaray | 6 | 2 | 2 | 2 | 10 | 13 | −3 | 8 | Advance to second group stage | 2–2 | — | 3–2 | 3–2 |
| 3 | (Scotland) Rangers | 6 | 2 | 2 | 2 | 10 | 7 | +3 | 8 | Transfer to UEFA Cup | 5–0 | 0–0 | — | 2–2 |
| 4 | (France) Monaco | 6 | 2 | 1 | 3 | 13 | 10 | +3 | 7 | | 5–0 | 4–2 | 0–1 | — |

Source: UEFA
