= Gerry McMahon =

Northern Irish footballer

Personal information
- Full name: Gerard McMahon
- Date of birth: 29 December 1973 (age 52)
- Place of birth: Belfast, Northern Ireland
- Height: 1.80 m (5 ft 11 in)
- Position: Midfielder

Senior career*
Years	Team	Apps	(Gls)
1991–1992	Glenavon	7	(3)
1992–1996	Tottenham Hotspur	16	(0)
1994	→ Barnet (loan)	10	(2)
1996	→ Stoke City (loan)	4	(0)
1996–1998	Stoke City	48	(3)
1998–2000	St Johnstone	49	(1)
2000–2008	Glenavon	179	(40)
2019	Lurgan Celtic	1	(0)

International career
1995–1997	Northern Ireland	17	(2)

Managerial career
- 2018–2019: Lurgan Celtic
- * Club domestic league appearances and goals

Gerard McMahon (born 29 December 1973) is a Northern Irish football coach and former footballer.

As a player, he was a midfielder, who notably played in the Premier League for Tottenham Hotspur and in the Scottish Premiership for St Johnstone. He also played in the Football League for Barnet and Stoke City, having begun and ended his career with Glenavon. He was capped 17 times by Northern Ireland, scoring twice.

Since retiring, McMahon managed the Loughgall reserves before a spell as manager of Lurgan Celtic. In 2019 he briefly came out of retirement and played a game for Lurgan amidst an injury crisis.

== Club career ==
McMahon started with Glenavon as a 14-year-old, and had only broken into the first team in the second half of the 1991–92 season, making his Irish League debut against Newry in February 1992. He established himself in the side for the rest of the season, and it was his performance in the 4–0 Irish Cup sixth-round replay win against Glentoran that saw scouts from some of England's biggest clubs enquiring about him, and by the middle of March a transfer had been agreed with Tottenham Hotspur. Glenavon comfortably cruised to the final of the Irish Cup, and, in his last game before his £100,000 move to White Hart Lane, McMahon scored the free-kick which defeated Linfield 2–1.

After his move to London, it took him quite a while to settle, with the departure of Terry Venables and the arrival of Ossie Ardiles. McMahon, however, persevered and was eventually rewarded when his long-awaited first-team chance came at the end of the 1994–95 season. McMahon's Spurs debut came in May 1995, and he was a regular in the first-team squad throughout the following season, without really establishing himself in the starting eleven. He scored his first and what turned out to be only goal for Spurs against Östers IF in their 1995 UEFA Intertoto Cup campaign.

McMahon found his first-team opportunities at White Hart Lane limited, so in September 1996 he stepped down a division in order to further his career. He joined Stoke City for a fee of £450,000 and was a regular in the side under Lou Macari in 1996–97 playing in 40 matches scoring three goals, twice against Portsmouth and the opening goal in a 2–1 victory against West Bromwich Albion on the final day of the season which was the last league match at the Victoria Ground. Macari left Stoke in the summer of 1997 and in came Chic Bates. McMahon played in 20 matches for Stoke in 1997–98 and with the team struggling Bates was sacked in January 1998. In came Chris Kamara and sold McMahon to St Johnstone in February 1998, St Johnstone for £85,000.

Again, however, McMahon found himself out of the first team following a change of manager, with Paul Sturrock leaving McDiarmid Park the following year, and in the summer of 2000, when his contract expired, McMahon was allowed to leave. After trials with Notts County and Macclesfield Town, McMahon returned to Glenavon in August 2000, initially on a short-term contract, but after a month Colin Malone convinced him to sign a permanent deal. It proved a productive move as the Lurgan Blues finished as IFA Premier League runners-up. McMahon was appointed club captain for the 2001–02 season, and nearly earned a surprise international recall when Sammy McIlroy came to watch him in a UEFA Cup tie against Kilmarnock. In December 2002, in a home game against Glentoran, a tackle on McMahon led to both the bones in his leg being broken. He required three operations, and he was ruled him out of football for two seasons.

McMahon returned to fitness, helping Glenavon, who were relegated at the end of the 2003–04 campaign, regain their Premier League position as play-off winners in 2005, and subsequently consolidate their top-flight position the following season. On 25 July 2009, Glenavon hosted St Johnstone for McMahon's testimonial match, nine years after he left the Saints.

== International career ==
In May 1995 he won the first of his seventeen caps when he played for Northern Ireland against Canada in Edmonton.

== Coaching career ==
He retired from playing in 2012 and became Glenavon's reserve team manager before leaving to become assistant manager at Loughgall.

On 6 April 2019, following a goalkeeper injury crisis, McMahon briefly came out of retirement to play in nets for Lurgan Celtic, in a 3–0 away defeat to Banbridge Town.

== Career statistics ==
=== Club ===
Appearances and goals by club, season and competition
Club	Season	League			FA Cup		League Cup		Other		Total	
Club	Season	Division	Apps	Goals	Apps	Goals	Apps	Goals	Apps	Goals	Apps	Goals
Glenavon	1991–92	Irish League	7	3	—		—		—		7	3
Tottenham Hotspur	1994–95	Premier League	2	0	0	0	0	0	—		2	0
Tottenham Hotspur	1995–96	Premier League	14	0	1	0	3	0	2 (Note: Appearances in UEFA Intertoto Cup)	1	20	1
Tottenham Hotspur	Total		16	0	1	0	3	0	2	1	22	1
Barnet (loan)	1994–95	Third Division	10	2	2	1	0	0	1 (Note: Appearance in Football League Trophy)	0	13	3
Stoke City	1996–97	First Division	35	3	1	0	4	0	—		40	3
Stoke City	1997–98	First Division	17	0	0	0	3	0	—		20	0
Stoke City	Total		52	3	1	0	7	0	—		60	3
St Johnstone	1997–98	Scottish Premier League	10	0	0	0	0	0	—		10	0
St Johnstone	1998–99	Scottish Premier League	20	1	2	0	4	1	—		26	2
St Johnstone	1999–2000	Scottish Premier League	19	0	0	0	0	0	2 (Note: Appearances in UEFA Cup)	0	21	0
St Johnstone	Total		49	1	2	0	4	1	2	0	57	2
Glenavon	2000–01	Irish League Premier Division	33	13	—		—		—		33	13
Glenavon	2001–02	Irish League Premier Division	34	11	—		—		—		34	11
Glenavon	2002–03	Irish League Premier Division	18	2	—		—		—		18	2
Glenavon	2003–04	Irish Premier League	0	0	—		—		—		0	0
Glenavon	2004–05	Irish First League	18	4	—		—		—		18	4
Glenavon	2005–06	Irish Premier League	28	1	—		—		—		28	1
Glenavon	2006–07	Irish Premier League	26	6	—		—		—		26	6
Glenavon	2007–08	Irish Premier League	22	3	—		—		—		22	3
Glenavon	Total		179	40	—		—		—		179	40
Career Total			313	49	6	1	15	1	5	1	339	52

=== International ===
National team	Year	Apps	Goals
Northern Ireland	1995	4	1
Northern Ireland	1996	5	1
Northern Ireland	1997	8	0
Total		17	2
