= 1998 Scottish League Cup final =

- Event: 1998–99 Scottish League Cup
Rangers	St Johnstone
2	1
- Date: 29 November 1998
- Venue: Celtic Park, Glasgow
- Man of the Match: Nick Dasovic
- Referee: Hugh Dallas
- Attendance: 45,533

The 1998 Scottish League Cup final was played on 29 November 1998 at Celtic Park in Glasgow and was the final of the 52nd Scottish League Cup. The final was contested by Rangers and St Johnstone. Rangers won the match 2–1, with goals from Stéphane Guivarc'h and Jörg Albertz.

== Match details ==
29 November 1998

Rangers	2–1	St Johnstone
Guivarc'h 6'; Albertz 37'	Report	Dasovic 8'

Celtic Park, Glasgow
Attendance: 45,533
Referee: Hugh Dallas

=== Teams ===
RANGERS :
1	(Finland) Antti Niemi
2	(Italy) Sergio Porrini
3	(Italy) Lorenzo Amoruso (c)
4	(Scotland) Colin Hendry
5	(Netherlands) Arthur Numan
6	(Scotland) Barry Ferguson
7	(Russia) Andrei Kanchelskis
8	(Netherlands) Giovanni van Bronckhorst
9	(France) Stéphane Guivarc'h	(substituted off) 89'
10	(England) Rod Wallace
11	(Germany) Jörg Albertz	(substituted off) 65'
Substitutes:
12	(Australia) Tony Vidmar
14	(Scotland) Ian Ferguson	(substituted on) 65'
15	(Scotland) Gordon Durie	(substituted on) 89'
Manager:
(Netherlands) Dick Advocaat

ST JOHNSTONE :
1	(Scotland) Alan Main
2	(Scotland) John McQuillan
3	(Scotland) Darren Dods
4	(Republic of Ireland) Alan Kernaghan
5	(Scotland) Gary Bollan
6	(Scotland) John O'Neil
7	(Scotland) Philip Scott
8	(Canada) Nick Dasovic
9	(Scotland) Paul Kane
10	(Portugal) Miguel Simão	(substituted off) 84'
11	(Northern Ireland) George O'Boyle	(substituted off) 74'
Substitutes:
12	(Scotland) Allan Preston
14	(England) Nathan Lowndes	(substituted on) 74'
15	(Scotland) Roddy Grant	(substituted on) 84'
Manager:
(Scotland) Sandy Clark
