= 1998–99 Scottish League Cup =

Tournament details
- Country: Scotland

Final positions
- Champions: Rangers
- Runners-up: St Johnstone

The 1998–1999 Scottish League Cup was the 53rd staging of the Scotland's second most prestigious football knockout competition. The competition was won by Rangers, who defeated St Johnstone 2–1 in the Final. The Final was played at Celtic Park because Hampden Park was being redeveloped, work which was completed in time for the 1999 Scottish Cup Final.

This was the last season in which the competition was completed in the autumn, which meant that there was no League Cup Final held in the calendar year of 1999. The next Final to be played was the 1999–2000 Final, which was played in March 2000.

== First round ==
Home team	Score	Away team
Arbroath	0–1	Clydebank
Brechin City	2 – 2(p)	Hamilton Academical
Clyde	1 – 1(p)	Berwick Rangers
Cowdenbeath	0–2	Livingston
Dumbarton	0–4	Alloa Athletic
East Fife	3–2	Partick Thistle
Forfar Athletic	0–1	Stirling Albion
Queen of the South	1–4	Inverness Caledonian Thistle
Queen's Park	1–3	Ayr United
Ross County	4–1	Montrose
Stenhousemuir	1–0	East Stirlingshire
Stranraer	(p)1 – 1	Albion Rovers

== Second round ==
Home team	Score	Away team
Berwick Rangers	1–5	Falkirk
Dundee	0–1	Alloa Athletic
Dundee United	(p)2 – 2	Stirling Albion
East Fife	0–1	Motherwell
Hamilton Academical	1–2	Hibernian
Inverness Caledonian Thistle	0–3	Aberdeen
Livingston	1–0	Dunfermline Athletic
Morton	0–1	Ross County
Raith Rovers	2–0	Clydebank
St Johnstone	3–0	Stranraer
St Mirren	1–3	Ayr United
Stenhousemuir	0–2	Airdrieonians

== Third round ==
Home team	Score	Away team
Airdrieonians	1–0	Celtic
Heart of Midlothian	4–2	Raith Rovers
Hibernian	1–0	Aberdeen
Ross County	2–0	Dundee United
Falkirk	0–1	St Johnstone
Kilmarnock	3–1	Livingston
Motherwell	0–2	Ayr United
Rangers	4–0	Alloa Athletic

== Quarter-finals ==
Home team	Score	Away team
Heart of Midlothian	(p)1 – 1	Ross County
Ayr United	0–2	Rangers
Kilmarnock	0–1	Airdrieonians
St Johnstone	4–0	Hibernian

== Semi-finals ==
25 October 1998

Rangers	5–0	Airdrieonians
Johansson 6'; Ferguson 34'; Wallace 72', 77'; Durie 89'	Report

Celtic Park, Glasgow
Attendance: 21,171
Referee: Kenny Clark

27 October 1998

St Johnstone	3–0	Heart of Midlothian
Dasovic 41'; Preston 45'; O'Boyle 87'	Report

Easter Road, Edinburgh
Attendance: 12,027
Referee: Willie Young

== Final ==
29 November 1998

Rangers	2–1	St Johnstone
Guivarc'h 6'; Albertz 37'	Report	Dasovic 8'

Celtic Park, Glasgow
Attendance: 45,533
Referee: Hugh Dallas
