= Jörg Albertz =

German footballer

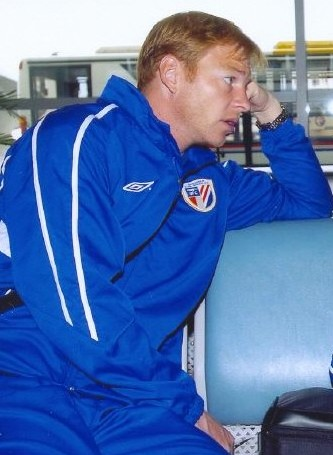
- Albertz in 2003

Personal information
- Date of birth: 29 January 1971 (age 55)
- Place of birth: Mönchengladbach, West Germany
- Height: 1.87 m (6 ft 2 in)
- Position: Midfielder

Youth career
- 1975–1978: PSV Mönchengladbach
- 1978–1989: Borussia Mönchengladbach

Senior career*
Years	Team	Apps	(Gls)
1989–1990	Borussia Mönchengladbach	0	(0)
1990–1993	Fortuna Düsseldorf	58	(4)
1993–1996	Hamburger SV	99	(22)
1996–2001	Rangers	156	(58)
2001–2003	Hamburger SV	28	(6)
2003–2004	Shanghai Shenhua	47	(13)
2004–2005	Greuther Fürth	13	(3)
2005–2007	Fortuna Düsseldorf	51	(7)
2008	Clyde	7	(2)
Total		459	(115)

International career
1996–1998	Germany	3	(0)
- * Club domestic league appearances and goals

Jörg Albertz (German pronunciation: [ˈjœʁk ˈʔalbɛʁts]; born 29 January 1971) is a German former professional footballer who played as a midfielder. Between 1996 and 1998, he played three international games for the Germany national team.

== Career ==
As both a youth player and apprentice, Albertz played for PSV Mönchengladbach and Borussia Mönchengladbach. His first professional contract was signed in 1990 for Fortuna Düsseldorf. When the team from the Rhineland were relegated to the second tier of the Bundesliga, Albertz moved to Hamburger SV where he soon became the public hero of the team. Two seasons later he became the club captain.

In 1996, Albertz signed for Rangers for £4 million, and he scored a famous free-kick against rivals Celtic in January 1997 to help them on the way to their ninth-consecutive Scottish league championship title. Albertz earned himself the nickname "The Hammer" for his powerful long-range shots. He scored two more important goals against Celtic, both of a similar nature involving individual runs from midfield, in April 1998, as Rangers closed in on another title and the Scottish Cup, but missed out on both trophies. After the departure of manager Walter Smith in June 1998, he was frequently left out of the starting line-up by the incoming Dick Advocaat. Despite this, he won further championship medals in 1999 and 2000, as well as the Scottish Cup – also in 1999 and 2000 – and the early-season Scottish League Cup in 1996 and 1998.

He returned to Hamburg in 2001. After 99 Bundesliga appearances, in which he scored 22 goals, he transferred to Chinese club Shanghai Shenhua in 2002–03. He immediately gained success with them when he won the 2003 league title. In 2003, the Chinese Football Association revoked the league title after it was discovered the Shenhua general manager Lou Shifang had bribed officials to give favourable decisions to Shenhua in games that season.

Having had a moderately successful spell in China, Albertz moved back to his homeland in 2004, his re-initiation into the German game coming with Greuther Fürth. On the receiving end of many injuries, he switched to Fortuna Düsseldorf once again, where he retired at the end of the 2006–07 season.

On 11 March 2008, Albertz confirmed he was training with Clyde with a view to a short-term move, to help out their manager and his former Rangers teammate John Brown. He registered to play on 14 March, and made his debut the following day, scoring a trademark free kick in a 1–1 draw with Stirling Albion. He scored Clyde's winning goal with another free kick in an important 2–1 victory over St Johnstone on 25 March, to lift Clyde out of the relegation play-off zone. After helping Clyde stay in the Scottish First Division via the playoffs, Albertz went into retirement once again, after making seven league appearances for the club, scoring twice.

== Career statistics ==
Appearances and goals by club, season and competition
Club	Season	League			National cup		League cup		Continental		Other		Total	
Club	Season	Division	Apps	Goals	Apps	Goals	Apps	Goals	Apps	Goals	Apps	Goals	Apps	Goals
Fortuna Düsseldorf	1990–91	Bundesliga	12	1	0	0	—		—		—		12	1
Fortuna Düsseldorf	1991–92	Bundesliga	11	0	0	0	—		—		—		11	0
Fortuna Düsseldorf	1992–93	2. Bundesliga	35	3	2	1	—		—		—		37	4
Fortuna Düsseldorf	Total		58	4	2	1	0	0	0	0	0	0	60	5
Hamburger SV	1993–94	Bundesliga	31	4	3	0	—		—		—		34	4
Hamburger SV	1994–95	Bundesliga	34	9	2	0	—		—		—		36	9
Hamburger SV	1995–96	Bundesliga	34	9	1	0	—		—		—		35	9
Hamburger SV	Total		99	22	6	0	0	0	0	0	0	0	105	22
Rangers	1996–97	Scottish Premier Division	32	10	3	0	5	3	7	0	—		47	13
Rangers	1997–98	Scottish Premier Division	31	10	5	3	1	0	5	2	—		42	15
Rangers	1998–99	Scottish Premier League	34	11	5	1	4	3	10	4	—		53	19
Rangers	1999–2000	Scottish Premier League	35	17	5	1	1	0	12	2	—		53	20
Rangers	2000–01	Scottish Premier League	24	10	1	0	1	1	8	4	—		34	15
Rangers	Total		156	58	19	5	12	7	42	12	0	0	229	82
Hamburger SV	2001–02	Bundesliga	24	4	1	0	—		—		—		25	4
Hamburger SV	2002–03	Bundesliga	4	2	1	1	—		—		—		5	3
Hamburger SV	Total		28	6	2	1	0	0	0	0	0	0	30	7
Shanghai Shenhua	2003	Chinese Jia-A League	27	6			—		—		—		27	6
Shanghai Shenhua	2004	Chinese Super League	20	7							—		20	7
Shanghai Shenhua	Total		47	13							0	0	47	13
Greuther Fürth	2004–05	2. Bundesliga	13	3	0	0	—		—		—		13	3
Fortuna Düsseldorf	2005–06	Regionalliga	23	3	0	0	—		—		—		23	3
Fortuna Düsseldorf	2006–07	Regionalliga	28	4	0	0	—		—		—		28	4
Fortuna Düsseldorf	Total		51	7	0	0	0	0	0	0	0	0	51	7
Clyde	2007–08	Scottish First Division	7	2					—		1 (Note: Appearance in league play-offs)	0	8	2
Career total			459	115	29	7	12	7	42	12	1	0	543	141

== Honours ==
Rangers

- Scottish Premier League: 1996–97, 1998–99, 1999–2000
- Scottish Cup: 1998–99, 1999–2000
- Scottish League Cup: 1996–97, 1998–99

Shanghai Shenhua

- Chinese Jia-A League: 2003 (revoked due to match-fixing scandal)

Individual

- SPL Player of the Month: May 2001
- Chinese Jia-A League Player of the Year: 2003
