= Rod Wallace =

English footballer (born 1969)

Personal information
- Full name: Rodney Seymour Wallace
- Date of birth: 2 October 1969 (age 57)
- Place of birth: Lewisham, London, England
- Height: 5 ft 7 in (1.70 m)
- Position: Striker

Team information
- Current team: Epsom & Ewell (Reserve team coach)

Youth career
- 1986–1987: Southampton

Senior career*
Years	Team	Apps	(Gls)
1987–1991	Southampton	128	(45)
1991–1998	Leeds United	212	(53)
1998–2001	Rangers	77	(40)
2001–2002	Bolton Wanderers	19	(3)
2002–2004	Gillingham	37	(12)
Total		473	(153)

International career
1989–1991	England U21	11	(2)
1990	England B	1	(0)
- * Club domestic league appearances and goals

Rodney Seymour Wallace (born 2 October 1969) is an English former professional footballer.

A striker, Wallace started his football career at Southampton in 1987, playing 128 league games and scoring 45 goals. This form earned him a transfer to Leeds United where he won the First Division championship.

After spending seven years at Leeds, Rangers signed him on a Bosman transfer in 1998. At Rangers, he scored 41 league goals and was part of a squad that won five domestic trophies in his first two seasons. In 2001, he signed for Bolton Wanderers on a free transfer, staying for one season, and then spent two seasons with Gillingham, before retiring from professional football.

== Playing career ==
=== Southampton ===
Wallace was born in Lewisham and signed for Southampton as an apprentice in 1986 along with his twin brother Ray. Their older brother, Danny had already become an established member of the Southampton first team.

On 22 October 1988, his two brothers Danny and Ray lined up alongside him in the Southampton team in a match at The Dell against Sheffield Wednesday; this was the first time three brothers had played in the same team in English professional top-flight football. In his best season at Southampton, 1989–90, he scored 21 goals in all competitions. The previous season also saw his goal tally reach double figures, as did the season after, as he formed an exciting young strikeforce with Alan Shearer and Matthew Le Tissier, which soon attracted interest from a number of bigger clubs.

The following year he played against Bulgaria, Republic of Ireland and United States for the England under-21 team.

=== Leeds United ===
Fellow top-flight team Leeds United signed him for £1.6 million in the summer of 1991, and he helped them win the First Division championship and Charity Shield competition a year later.

He became an integral part of the Leeds squad for the next seven years and was found often playing as an out-and-out striker or in a more wide position. In September 1992, Wallace was called up to the senior England squad for a friendly against Spain, but had to pull out because of injury. He was never called up for international duty again.

He scored a hat-trick for Leeds on the last day of the 1992–93 season in a 3–3 draw at Coventry City.

Wallace won the 1993–94 Goal of the Season competition with a mazy dribble against Tottenham Hotspur in a Premier League game on 17 April 1994. His brother, Danny, had won the same award ten seasons earlier, making them the first and, to date, only brothers to win the award. Leeds finished fifth at the end of that season, repeating this finish in 1995 and 1998. Wallace's contract with the Elland Road club was due to expire in the summer of 1998 and this resulted in a Bosman transfer to Scottish club Rangers.

=== Rangers ===
In Scotland he won five medals to add to the silverware won during his time in England. In his first season, he won the domestic treble, finishing as top scorer with 27 goals and scoring the winning goal in the 1999 Scottish cup final win over Celtic, the first cup final to be played at the fully renovated Hampden Park. He was also shortlisted for the SPFA Player of the Year in 1999. The following season he was part of the squad that won the league and cup double. In total he made 122 appearances and scored 56 goals.

=== Bolton Wanderers ===
In 2001, he returned to English football on a free transfer to link up with newly promoted Bolton Wanderers of the Premier League. He scored on his début away to Blackburn Rovers at Ewood Park and managed to net further goals against Tottenham Hotspur and Blackburn again. He also scored once in the League Cup against Nottingham Forest. Wallace successfully helped Bolton avoid relegation, but moved on after rejecting a new one-year contract.

=== Gillingham ===
In June 2002 he joined Gillingham on a two-year contract and managed to score 12 goals in his first full season at the Priestfield Stadium. His time with the Gills was blighted by a succession of injuries and at the end of the 2003–04 season he announced his retirement from professional football. The summer of 2004 saw him return to Southampton in a one-off benefit game organised for elder brother Danny who has been diagnosed with the condition multiple sclerosis.

== Coaching career ==
In January 2008, he was appointed as assistant manager of Kingstonian's under 18 side, before joining Molesey for season 2010–11. Wallace joined Epsom & Ewell as a reserve team coach in October 2011.

== Career statistics ==
Appearances and goals by club, season and competition
Club	Season	League			National cup		League cup		Other		Total	
Club	Season	Division	Apps	Goals	Apps	Goals	Apps	Goals	Apps	Goals	Apps	Goals
Southampton	1987–88	First Division	15	1	0	0	0	0	1 (Note: Appearances in Full Members' Cup)	0	16	1
Southampton	1988–89	First Division	38	12	2	0	7	2	2	1	49	15
Southampton	1989–90	First Division	38	18	3	1	7	2	—		48	21
Southampton	1990–91	First Division	37	14	5	2	5	2	1	1	48	19
Southampton	Total		128	45	10	3	19	6	4	2	161	56
Leeds United	1991–92	First Division	34	11	1	0	3	2	1	1	39	14
Leeds United	1992–93	Premier League	32	7	4	0	1	0	4 (Note: Appearances in Community Shield (1 appearance) and Champions League (3 appearances, 1 goal))	1	41	8
Leeds United	1993–94	Premier League	37	17	1	0	1	0	—		39	17
Leeds United	1994–95	Premier League	32	4	3	0	2	0	—		37	4
Leeds United	1995–96	Premier League	24	1	4	1	5	0	—		33	2
Leeds United	1996–97	Premier League	22	3	4	2	3	3	—		29	8
Leeds United	1997–98	Premier League	31	10	4	1	4	2	—		39	13
Leeds United	Total		212	53	21	4	19	7	5	2	257	66
Rangers	1998–99	Scottish Premier League	34	19	5 (Note: Appearances in Scottish FA Cup)	3	4 (Note: Appearances in Scottish League Cup)	2	8 (Note: Appearances in Europa League)	3	51	27
Rangers	1999–2000	Scottish Premier League	28	16	5	1	1	1	10 (Note: Appearances in Europa League (2 appearances, 1 goal) and Champions League (8 appearances, 1 goal))	2	44	20
Rangers	2000–01	Scottish Premier League	15	5	1	0	1	1	8 (Note: Appearances in Europa League (2 appearances) and Champions League (6 appearances, 2 goal))	2	25	8
Rangers	Total		77	40	11	4	6	4	26	7	120	55
Bolton Wanderers	2001–02	Premier League	19	3	1	0	3	1	—		23	4
Gillingham	2002–03	First Division	22	11	2	0	1	0	—		25	11
Gillingham	2003–04	First Division	15	1	0	0	1	0	—		16	1
Gillingham	Total		37	12	2	0	2	0	0	0	41	12
Career total			473	153	45	11	49	18	35	11	602	193

== Honours ==
Leeds United

- First Division: 1991–92
- FA Charity Shield: 1992

Rangers

- Scottish Premier League: 1998–99, 1999–2000
- Scottish Cup: 1998–99, 1999–2000
- Scottish League Cup: 1998–99
