= Jani Kauppila =

Finnish footballer (born 1980)

Personal information
- Date of birth: 16 January 1980 (age 46)
- Place of birth: Oulu, Finland
- Height: 1.82 m (6 ft 0 in)
- Position: Midfielder

Senior career*
Years	Team	Apps	(Gls)
1997–1998	OPS		
1999	OLS	21	(3)
2000	Tervarit	26	(4)
2000–2002	Rangers	4	(0)
2003–2010	Haka	178	(9)
2011–2012	Oulu	47	(6)

International career
2001	Finland U21	4	(0)
- * Club domestic league appearances and goals

Jani Kauppila (born 16 January 1980, Oulu) is a retired Finnish footballer who played as a midfielder.

Kauppila joined Rangers in January 2001. He made his debut as a sub against Hearts on 3 March 2001, coming on in the 23rd minute before being substituted off at half-time. After four appearances in total Kauppila left Rangers in 2002. He won the Finland Cup with his side FC Haka in 2005.
