= Kieran McAnespie =

Footballer (born 1979)

Personal information
- Full name: Kieran Liam McAnespie
- Date of birth: 11 September 1979 (age 47)
- Place of birth: Gosport, England
- Height: 5 ft 8 in (1.73 m)
- Positions: Full-back; winger

Youth career
- Milngavie Boys Club

Senior career*
Years	Team	Apps	(Gls)
1995–2000	St Johnstone	50	(5)
2000–2003	Fulham	0	(0)
2001	→ Heart of Midlothian (loan)	5	(0)
2002	→ AFC Bournemouth (loan)	7	(1)
2003	Plymouth Argyle	4	(0)
2003–2004	Falkirk	31	(3)
2004–2006	St Johnstone	23	(0)
2006	Ayr United	20	(2)
2006–2007	Alloa Athletic	26	(3)
2007–2009	Greenock Morton	14	(1)
2009	→ Dumbarton (loan)	4	(0)
2009	Milngavie Wanderers		
2010	Bellshill Athletic		
2010–2012	Arbroath	52	(6)
2012–2014	Stirling Albion	45	(5)
2014–2015	Kilbirnie Ladeside		
2015–2016	Petershill		
2017–2019	Clydebank	12	(1)

International career
1998–2000	Scotland U21	6	(0)

Managerial career
- 2017–2019: Clydebank
- 2020–2021: Cumbernauld United
- * Club domestic league appearances and goals

Kieran Liam McAnespie (born 11 September 1979) is a football manager and former player. Capable of playing as a full-back or winger, he appeared in the Scottish Premier League for St Johnstone and Hearts. Born in England as a teenager he represented the Scotland U21 national team internationally

McAnespie was manager of Clydebank but left when he became a fireman in 2019. He managed Cumbernauld United from 2020 to 2021. McAnespie then took up a coaching role at Darvel.

== Playing career ==
McAnespie graduated from the youth ranks at St Johnstone, making his first team début against Clydebank on 4 February 1997. He made one further appearance that season as Saints won promotion to the Premier Division. He scored on both occasions. He went on to make 50 league appearances for the Saints, notably scoring in wins against both Celtic and Rangers in the 1998–99 season. In 1998, McAnespie was one of four younger players asked to accompany the Scotland national side to the 1998 FIFA World Cup to gain experience. He was already a member of the Scotland U21 side and Craig Brown's idea was designed to ease the transition of younger players into the full national side. McAnespie, however, would never gain a full international call-up.

McAnespie joined Fulham in 2000, for a reported fee of £80,000. Considered an investment for the future, he managed only two League Cup appearances during his three years with the London side. This period was punctuated by brief loan spells with Hearts and AFC Bournemouth. At Bournemouth he scored once against Bristol City. Upon returning to Fulham, he spent the rest of the season playing in the reserve team. McAnespie would recall his disappointment at his loan spell at Bournemouth. He was released in early 2003 and turned out four times for Paul Sturrock's Plymouth Argyle at the end of the 2002–03 season before returning to Scotland with Falkirk.

Having returned to Scottish football, McAnespie spent several short, injury-disrupted spells with lower division clubs. He left Falkirk in October 2004 to return to St Johnstone, before joining Ayr United in January 2006. He rejected Ayr's offer to re-sign in the summer and instead joined Alloa Athletic. On 21 June 2007, McAnespie was sold by Alloa to Greenock Morton for a five figure fee (rumoured to be £11,750). At Morton he scored his first and only goal for the club against Partick Thistle.

In the summer of 2008, McAnespie went on trial with Wycombe Wanderers, where he scored against Flackwell Heath, but was unsuccessful in getting a move to the Chairboys, and remained with Morton for a further season. This included a loan spell at near-neighbours Third Division side Dumbarton, until the end of the season. Sadly for McAnespie, he injured himself again after only one game for Dumbarton so spent most of his time at the Rock on the sidelines. McAnespie was released after the end of the 2008–2009 season, as confirmed by Davie Irons on 8 May in the Greenock Telegraph.

McAnespie's time in retirement was short, with Arbroath picking him up on a one-year contract for the 2010–11 season. In June 2012, he joined Stirling Albion, having been released by Arbroath at the end of the 2011–12 season. On 4 April 2014, McAnespie left Stirling Albion due to work commitments. McAnespie signed for Junior side Kilbirnie Ladeside in July 2014. He then moved onto Petershill before a coaching stint at Glenafton.

McAnespie was unveiled as player-manager of Clydebank in 2017, making 12 appearances for The Bankies before resigning in 2019.

== Coaching career ==
McAnespie was a coach at junior club Glenafton in 2016.

He coached at Darvel from 2021 until June 2022.

== Managerial career ==
On 19 January 2017, McAnespie was appointed manager of Clydebank. After a torrid start to his managerial career, McAnespie guided his side to six consecutive wins in the final matches of the season and won promotion to the top flight.

After leaving Clydebank in 2019, he was assistant manager of Cumbernauld United until April 2020 where he was named manager to take them into the new West of Scotland Football League.

He resigned in 2021 before taking up a coaching role at Darvel later in the year.
