= Keith O'Halloran =

Irish footballer

Personal information
- Full name: Keith James O'Halloran
- Date of birth: 10 November 1975 (age 50)
- Place of birth: Dublin, Ireland
- Position: Midfielder

Senior career*
Years	Team	Apps	(Gls)
1994–1997	Middlesbrough	4	(0)
1996	→ Scunthorpe United (loan)	7	(0)
1996–1997	→ Cardiff City (loan)	8	(0)
1997–2000	St Johnstone	71	(3)
2000–2003	Swindon Town	46	(7)
2004–2005	Shamrock Rovers	37	(4)
Total		173	(14)
- * Club domestic league appearances and goals

Keith James O'Halloran (born 10 November 1975) is an Irish former professional footballer.

== Career ==
A right winger, O'Halloran began his career with Middlesbrough in 1994. He remained at Ayresome Park for three years, making just four league appearances.

After loan spells at Scunthorpe United and Cardiff City, he joined Scottish club St Johnstone, then managed by Paul Sturrock, for a £50,000 fee. In three years at McDiarmid Park, O'Halloran made 71 appearances, netting three goals along the way.

In 2000, he returned south of the border to join Swindon Town. He left Town in 2003 with 46 appearances and seven goals to his name. He then signed for Shamrock Rovers and in his two seasons scored 4 goals in 43 total appearances. He made his Rovers debut on 19 March.
