= Tero Penttilä =

Finnish footballer (born 1975)

Personal information
- Full name: Tero Penttilä
- Date of birth: 9 March 1975 (age 51)
- Place of birth: Suomussalmi, Finland
- Position: Defender

Senior career*
Years	Team	Apps	(Gls)
1992–1993	Reipas Lahti	9	(0)
1994–1996	Kuusysi	74	(14)
1997–1998	Lahti	45	(19)
1999	Haka	39	(4)
1999–2002	Rangers	4	(0)
2001	→ Haka (loan)	11	(1)
2002–2005	HJK	20	(1)
Total		187	(36)

International career
2000–2005	Finland	5	(0)
- * Club domestic league appearances and goals

Tero Penttilä (born 9 March 1975) is a former professional football player who played for Rangers in defence.

== Club career ==
Penttilä began football career at Reipas Lahti, before moving to arch rivals FC Kuusysi in 1994. By 1997, the two sides had merged and become FC Lahti. Penttilä continued to play for the side until 1999, when he moved to Haka Valkeakoski, where he won his first Veikkausliiga title. It was at Haka that the then Rangers manager Dick Advocaat noticed him during a UEFA Champions League qualifier. Penttilä joined the Gers in November 1999, he cost £300,000.

He made a total of five top team appearances (four in the league) over three seasons and left Rangers on 16 May 2002. He made 4 of his 5 appearances in the 1999/2000 season, but didn't make his 5th and final appearance until the 2001/02 season when he came on as a substitute against Kilmarnock. He returned to Veikkausliiga, with HJK Helsinki a month later. Penttilä was named team captain and won 2002 & 2003 league titles with the club. He retired in 2005 due to a knee injury and went on to study medicine.

== International career ==
Penttila won five caps for Finland.

== Post-playing career ==
As of 2022, Penttilä is a cardiologist at Tampere University Hospital.

== Career statistics ==
As of 1 September 2024.

Appearances and goals by club, season and competition
Club	Season	League			Europe		Total	
Club	Season	Division	Apps	Goals	Apps	Goals	Apps	Goals
Reipas Lahti	1992	Ykkönen	9	0	–		9	0
Reipas Lahti	1993	Ykkönen	0	0	–		0	0
Reipas Lahti	Total		9	0	0	0	9	0
Kuusysi	1994	Veikkausliiga	18	0	–		18	0
Kuusysi	1995	Veikkausliiga	25	7	–		25	7
Kuusysi	1996	Ykkönen	27	5	–		27	5
Kuusysi	Total		70	12	0	0	70	12
Lahti	1997	Ykkönen	26	10	–		26	10
Lahti	1998	Ykkönen	19	9	–		19	9
Lahti	Total		45	19	0	0	45	19
Haka	1999	Veikkausliiga	28	3	4 (Note: Appearances in UEFA Champions League)	0	32	3
Rangers	1999–00	Scottish Premier League	3	0	0	0	3	0
Rangers	2000–01	Scottish Premier League	0	0	0	0	0	0
Rangers	2001–02	Scottish Premier League	1	0	0	0	1	0
Rangers	Total		4	0	0	0	4	0
Haka (loan)	2001	Veikkausliiga	11	1	–		11	1
HJK	2002	Veikkausliiga	20	1	2 (Note: Appearances in UEFA Europa League)	0	22	1
Career total			188	36	6	0	194	36

== Honours ==
Haka

- Veikkausliiga: 1999

HJK

- Veikkausliiga: 2002
