= Nathan Lowndes =

English footballer (born 1977)

Personal information
- Full name: Nathan Peter Lowndes
- Date of birth: 2 June 1977 (age 49)
- Place of birth: Salford, England
- Height: 5 ft 10 in (1.78 m)
- Position: Forward

Youth career
- Leeds United

Senior career*
| Years | Team | Apps | (Gls) |
| 1994–1995 | Leeds United | 0 | (0) |
| 1995–1998 | Watford | 7 | (0) |
| 1998–2001 | St Johnstone | 64 | (14) |
| 2001–2002 | Livingston | 21 | (3) |
| 2002 | → Rotherham United (loan) | 2 | (0) |
| 2002–2004 | Plymouth Argyle | 53 | (10) |
| 2004–2007 | Port Vale | 59 | (6) |
| 2007–2008 | Chester City | 12 | (0) |
| 2012–2013 | Scone Thistle | | |
| Total | | 218 | (33) |
- * Club domestic league appearances and goals

Nathan Peter Lowndes (born 2 June 1977) is an English former footballer who played as a forward.

He began his career with Leeds United but failed to break into the first before his move to Watford in 1995. After making little impact at Watford, he moved to Scotland to play for St Johnstone in 1998. Three years later, he transferred to Livingston. In 2002, he was loaned out to Rotherham United, before he moved back to England permanently with Plymouth Argyle later in the year. In 2004, he joined Port Vale, where he would stay for three years. He finished his professional career with Chester City at the end of the 2007–08 campaign, though he came out of retirement to join Scone Thistle in May 2012.

== Career ==
Lowndes began his career with Leeds United in April 1995 but did not make any first-team appearances in his time at Elland Road. On 3 October 1995, he was signed by Watford for a fee of £40,000. Despite being seen as a promising player in three years with Watford, he only made three starts and was unable to score a goal. He played only a cameo role in the club's 1997–98 Second Division winning season.

On 21 August 1998, he joined Scottish club St Johnstone, who were in their second season back in the Premier League. In his first season in Perth, he helped "Saints" to a third-place finish (which qualified them for the following season's UEFA Cup), an appearance in the League Cup final, and the last four of the Scottish Cup. In the final of the League Cup at Celtic Park, he was a late substitute for George O'Boyle, as Rangers celebrated a 2–1 win. He was the club's top scorer in 1999–2000 with eleven goals, which included a goal in the preliminary rounds of the UEFA Cup that helped the club reach a first round tie with AS Monaco. After the first leg, the striker told of how opponent Marco Simone came into the away dressing room and asked Lowndes for a signed shirt. Despite the striker's fortunes the club could not replicate the success of the previous campaign. He made just twelve appearances in the 2000–01 season as the club flirted with relegation. In his three years at McDiarmid Park, Lowndes made 63 appearances and scored 14 goals. In May 2001, Lowndes signed for Livingston, for whom he made 21 appearances and scored three goals. Livingston enjoyed a highly successful season, finishing the league campaign in third place.

In March 2002, he returned to England with Plymouth Argyle, then managed by Paul Sturrock, who had signed him to St Johnstone four years earlier. He helped the club to the Second Division title in 2003–04, scoring ten goals in 33 games. Over his two years with Plymouth, Lowndes made 57 appearances and scored twelve goals, playing mostly as a substitute or out of position at wide midfield. He joined Martin Foyle's Port Vale in November 2004, but was released in May 2007 after failing to make an impact at the club. He was though a first-team regular in the 2005–06 campaign, in which he made 41 of his 67 Port Vale appearances, and scored six of his seven Vale goals. He subsequently joined League Two side Chester, who were managed by Bobby Williamson, Lowndes's manager at Plymouth for a short time. In January 2008 he was the subject of interest from Conference side Torquay United. The move did not go through but Lowndes did not play again for Chester due to injury. On 23 April 2008 his contract was cancelled by mutual consent. In May 2012, Lowndes came out of retirement when he signed for Scottish Junior side Scone Thistle; he balanced his playing duties with his job serving Tayside Police.

== Personal life ==
His sister, Emma Lowndes, is an actress.

== Career statistics ==
Appearances and goals by club, season and competition
| Club | Season | League | | | FA Cup | | League Cup | | Other | | Total | |
| Club | Season | Division | Apps | Goals | Apps | Goals | Apps | Goals | Apps | Goals | Apps | Goals |
|---|---|---|---|---|---|---|---|---|---|---|---|---|
| Watford | 1995–96 | First Division | 0 | 0 | 0 | 0 | 0 | 0 | — | | 0 | 0 |
| Watford | 1996–97 | Second Division | 3 | 0 | 0 | 0 | 1 | 0 | 0 | 0 | 4 | 0 |
| Watford | 1997–98 | Second Division | 4 | 0 | 2 | 0 | 0 | 0 | 1 (Note: Appearance(s) in the EFL Trophy.) | 0 | 7 | 0 |
| Watford | Total | | 7 | 0 | 2 | 0 | 1 | 0 | 1 | 0 | 11 | 0 |
| St Johnstone | 1998–99 | SPL | 28 | 2 | 3 | 0 | 3 | 2 | 0 | 0 | 34 | 4 |
| St Johnstone | 1999–2000 | SPL | 26 | 10 | 1 | 0 | 1 | 0 | 4 (Note: Appearance(s) in the UEFA Cup.) | 1 | 32 | 11 |
| St Johnstone | 2000–01 | SPL | 10 | 2 | 2 | 1 | 0 | 0 | 0 | 0 | 12 | 3 |
| St Johnstone | Total | | 64 | 14 | 6 | 1 | 4 | 2 | 4 | 1 | 78 | 18 |
| Livingston | 2001–02 | SPL | 21 | 3 | 2 | 0 | 2 | 0 | 0 | 0 | 25 | 3 |
| Rotherham United (loan) | 2001–02 | First Division | 2 | 0 | — | | — | | — | | 2 | 0 |
| Plymouth Argyle | 2002–03 | Second Division | 16 | 2 | 0 | 0 | 1 | 0 | 0 | 0 | 17 | 2 |
| Plymouth Argyle | 2003–04 | Second Division | 33 | 8 | 1 | 0 | 0 | 0 | 2 | 2 | 36 | 10 |
| Plymouth Argyle | 2004–05 | Championship | 4 | 0 | 0 | 0 | 0 | 0 | 0 | 0 | 4 | 0 |
| Plymouth Argyle | Total | | 53 | 10 | 1 | 0 | 1 | 0 | 2 | 2 | 57 | 12 |
| Port Vale | 2004–05 | League One | 12 | 1 | 2 | 0 | — | | — | | 14 | 1 |
| Port Vale | 2005–06 | League One | 35 | 5 | 4 | 1 | 1 | 0 | 1 | 0 | 41 | 6 |
| Port Vale | 2006–07 | League One | 12 | 0 | 0 | 0 | 0 | 0 | 0 | 0 | 12 | 0 |
| Port Vale | Total | | 59 | 6 | 6 | 1 | 1 | 0 | 1 | 0 | 67 | 7 |
| Chester City | 2007–08 | League Two | 12 | 0 | 1 | 0 | 1 | 0 | 1 | 0 | 15 | 0 |
| Career total | | | 218 | 33 | 18 | 2 | 10 | 2 | 9 | 3 | 255 | 40 |

== Honours ==
Watford

- Football League Second Division: 1997–98

St Johnstone

- Scottish League Cup runner-up: 1997–98

Plymouth Argyle

- Football League Second Division: 2003–04
