= Nick Dasovic =

Canadian soccer player (born 1968)

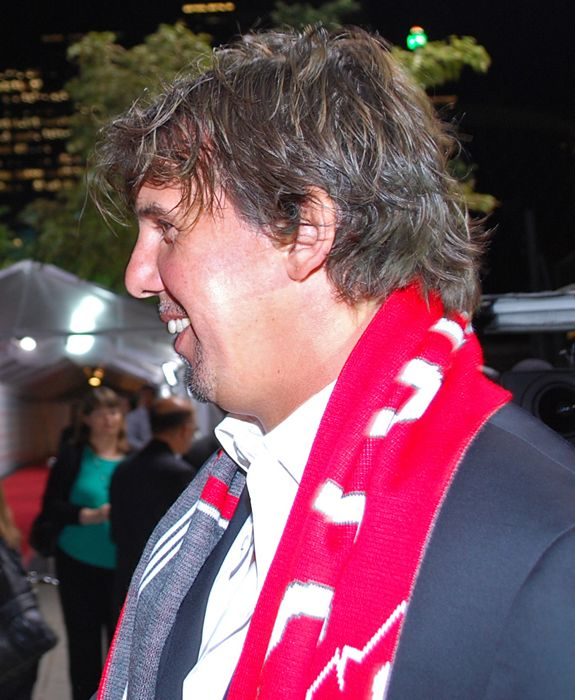
- Dasovic in 2009

Personal information
- Full name: Nick Robert Dasovic
- Date of birth: December 5, 1968 (age 57)
- Place of birth: Vancouver, British Columbia, Canada
- Height: 6 ft 1 in (1.85 m)
- Position: Midfielder

Youth career
- 1975–: Vancouver Croatia Youth

Senior career*
Years	Team	Apps	(Gls)
1988–1989	NK Segesta Sisak	45	(2)
1990	NK Dinamo Zagreb	1	(0)
1991	NK Zagreb	0	(0)
1991–1992	North York Rockets	35	(0)
1993–1994	Montreal Impact	36	(4)
1995	Vancouver 86ers	2	(0)
1995–1996	Stade Briochin	21	(1)
1996	Vancouver 86ers	10	(1)
1996	Trelleborgs FF	7	(0)
1996–2002	St Johnstone FC	137	(3)
2002–2005	Vancouver Whitecaps FC	81	(3)
Total		375	(13)

International career
1992–2004	Canada	63	(2)

Managerial career
- 2006: Whitecaps FC Reserves
- 2008–2010: TFC Academy
- 2008: Canada U23
- 2010: Toronto FC (interim)
- 2011–2013: Canada U20
- 2019–2020: Vancouver Whitecaps U23
- 2022–2023: Whitecaps FC Academy U19
Medal record
Representing Canada
Men's soccer
CONCACAF Gold Cup
Winner	2000 United States
Third place	2002 United States
- * Club domestic league appearances and goals

Nick Robert Dasovic (born December 5, 1968) is a Canadian soccer manager and former professional soccer player who played as a midfielder and is now the assistant manager for Canadian Premier League side Vancouver FC.

He began his career with Croatian club HNK Segesta in 1988, followed by short stints at NK Dinamo Zagreb and NK Zagreb. He moved back to his homeland in 1991, playing first for North York Rockets, then the newly formed Montreal Impact in 1993. In 1995, he joined Vancouver 86ers before returning to Europe briefly to play for Stade Briochin. Another period with Vancouver 86ers in 1996 was followed by a short stint in Sweden with Trelleborgs FF. He finished his playing career with Scottish club St Johnstone, with whom he spent six years and made over 100 league appearances. He won promotion to the Scottish top flight in his first season in Perth.

Dasovic represented the Canada men's national soccer team on 63 occasions between 1992 and 2004, scoring twice.

His coaching career began with Whitecaps FC Reserves in 2006. He became manager of TFC Academy in 2008, a role he balanced briefly with a stint as manager of the Canada under-23s. In 2010, he was named interim manager of Toronto FC. The following year, he was installed as manager of the Canada under-20s, a role in which he remained for two years.

In 2019, he re-joined the Vancouver Whitecaps FC organization, first with the Vancouver Whitecaps U23 team, and then again as manager of the Whitecaps FC Academy U-19s.

He was announced as the new assistant coach for Detroit City FC of the USL Championship under head coach Danny Dichio on August 20, 2024.

On January 15, 2026, he was appointed to be an assistant manager for Vancouver FC in the Canadian Premier League under head coach Martin Nash.

== Club career ==
A midfielder, Dasovic began his career in the Yugoslav First League and later the Croatian First League playing for Croatian club Dinamo Zagreb, renamed Croatia Zagreb during the 1990s. The team also featured important players like Mario Stanić and Goran Vlaović.

He began playing in Canada professionally with the North York Rockets, of the former Canadian Soccer League, for whom he played the 1991 and 1992 seasons. Dasovic played the 1993 and 1994 seasons in the American Professional Soccer League with the Montreal Impact.

Dasovic played for Stade Briochin in the French Championnat National in 1995 and for Swedish Allsvenskan side Trelleborgs FF in 1996.

=== St. Johnstone ===
In November 1996, Dasovic signed for Scottish club St Johnstone. His first season in Perth saw the Saints win promotion from the Scottish First Division to the Scottish Premier League. Dasovic was named man-of-the-match in the 1998 Scottish League Cup Final in which he scored, a 2–1 defeat against Rangers. Saints went on to finish third behind Rangers and Celtic in the Scottish Premier League that season, qualifying for the 1999–2000 UEFA Cup. Dasovic's only league goal was also memorable; it was the only goal in a 1–0 win away at Celtic in September 1998.

== International career ==
Dasovic made his senior debut for Canada in an April 1992 friendly match against China and went on to earn 63 caps, scoring twice. He represented Canada in 14 World Cup qualifiers and played at the 2001 FIFA Confederations Cup.

His final international game was a January 2004 friendly match against Barbados.

=== International goals ===
Scores and results list Canada's goal tally first.

#	Date	Venue	Opponent	Score	Result	Competition
1	July 11, 1993	Estadio Azteca, Mexico City, Mexico	Costa Rica	1–0	1–1	1993 CONCACAF Gold Cup
2	October 13, 1996	Commonwealth Stadium, Edmonton, Alberta, Canada	Cuba	2–0	2–0	1998 FIFA World Cup qualification

== Coaching career ==
Dasovic led Canada's under-23 side through Olympic qualification in 2008, drawing Mexico 1–1 in the group stage and helping to eliminate the heavily favored Mexican team in the process. After a highly promising 5–0 win over Guatemala, on a night when Mexico had to better that result against Haiti but could only win 5–1, Canada fell to the United States 3–0 in the semifinal, losing out on a spot in Beijing at the summer Olympics. Canada recovered to defeat Guatemala in the third-place playoff, a rematch of their first-round game, winning on penalties (5–3) after a scoreless draw through 120 minutes.

On May 6, 2008, Dasovic joined MLS club Toronto FC as TFC Academy head coach and second assistant to the first team. He became first assistant when manager John Carver left the club in 2009 and was replaced by his understudy Chris Cummins as interim coach. In September 2010, he became interim head coach of Toronto FC after the firing of Preki, a position he held until January 2011 when Aron Winter became the head coach. On December 2, 2011, Dasovic was named head coach of Canada U20 national team.

Dasovic was hired as an assistant coach by the San Jose Earthquakes on June 18, 2013. Dasovic was relieved of coaching duties at San Jose along with head coach Mark Watson on October 15, 2014.

Dasovic received his UEFA Pro Licence from the Scottish Football Association in 2012.

Dasovic coached the U-15 team at Mountain United FC in 2017. In July 2018, Dasovic was hired as an assistant manager for Simon Fraser University Men's Soccer team.

On January 18, 2019, Dasovic joined the technical staff of Vancouver Whitecaps and was named head coach of the newly formed U-23 development squad.

In January 2021, Vancouver reorganized their Academy staff and Dasovic became the manager for the Whitecaps FC Academy U-19 team.

== Canadian Soccer Hall of Fame ==
Dasovic was inducted into the Canadian Soccer Hall of Fame in 2011.

== Broadcasting ==
In 2015 Dasovic joined the MLS on TSN crew and is used selected weeks as a studio or game analyst.

== Honours ==
Canada

- CONCACAF Gold Cup: 2000; 3rd place, 2002
