= Miguel Simão =

Portuguese footballer

Personal information
- Full name: Miguel Ângelo da Cruz Simão
- Date of birth: 26 February 1973 (age 53)
- Place of birth: Porto, Portugal
- Height: 1.75 m (5 ft 9 in)
- Position: Forward

Youth career
- 1984–1985: Porto
- 1985–1991: Boavista

Senior career*
Years	Team	Apps	(Gls)
1991–1992	Nacional	22	(1)
1992–1993	Feirense	26	(1)
1993–1995	Salgueiros	50	(7)
1995	Nacional	16	(0)
1996	Académica	8	(0)
1996–1997	Salgueiros	16	(0)
1997–1998	Aves	26	(3)
1998–2000	St Johnstone	43	(5)
2000	Sanfrecce Hiroshima	3	(0)
2001	Gil Vicente	15	(2)
2001–2002	Moreirense	16	(3)
2002–2003	Fafe	26	(1)
2003–2004	Lichtenberg 47	13	(0)
2004–2005	Grevenmacher		
2005–2006	CeBra 01		
2006–2007	FC Munsbach		
2008–2009	Young Boys Diekirch		
2011–2013	Moutfort-Medingen		
Total		280	(23)

International career
1989	Portugal U17	6	(0)
1989	Portugal U18	1	(0)
1993–1994	Portugal U21	14	(1)
- * Club domestic league appearances and goals

Miguel Ângelo da Cruz Simão (born 26 February 1973) is a Portuguese retired professional footballer who played mainly as a forward.

== Football career ==
Born in Porto, Simão successfully emerged through local Boavista FC's youth system, making his professional debuts in the Segunda Liga with C.D. Nacional and joining another club in that division, C.D. Feirense, in the following season. He first competed in the Primeira Liga with S.C. Salgueiros, playing in 22 games in 1993–94 as his team finished in 11th position (five goals scored).

Simão spent most of the following four years in the second level, the exception being the 1996–97 campaign with Salgueiros. In the 1998 summer he joined Scottish club St Johnstone, making his debut on 29 August in a 0–4 loss against Rangers at Ibrox Stadium, which proved to be manager Paul Sturrock's final game in charge; he played in 26 Premier League matches in his first year, netting four times.

Three days shy of celebrating one year since playing his first game for the Saints, Simão scored two late goals as a substitute against Vaasan Palloseura in the UEFA Cup, in a playoff round 2–0 home win (3–1 on aggregate). After a few months in J1 League with Sanfrecce Hiroshima, he returned to Portugal for a further two-and-a-half seasons with three clubs, appearing with Gil Vicente F.C. in the top flight.
