= Stéphane Guivarc'h =

French footballer (born 1970)

Personal information
- Full name: Stéphane Pierre Yves Guivarc'h
- Date of birth: 6 September 1970 (age 56)
- Place of birth: Concarneau, France
- Height: 1.84 m (6 ft 0 in)
- Position: Striker

Youth career
- US Trégunc
- 1984–1989: Brest

Senior career*
Years	Team	Apps	(Gls)
1989–1991	Brest	14	(1)
1991–1995	Guingamp	110	(68)
1995–1996	Auxerre	23	(3)
1996–1997	Rennes	36	(22)
1997–1998	Auxerre	32	(21)
1998	Newcastle United	4	(1)
1998–1999	Rangers	14	(5)
1999–2001	Auxerre	60	(25)
2001–2002	Guingamp	11	(1)
Total		304	(147)

International career
1997–1999	France	14	(1)
- * Club domestic league appearances and goals

Stéphane Pierre Yves Guivarc'h (born 6 September 1970) is a French former professional footballer who played as striker. He featured in the France squad that won the 1998 FIFA World Cup on home soil.

His early career was spent in France with the Breton clubs Brest and Guingamp before moving to Auxerre, where he won Division 1 in 1996. He returned to Brittany with Rennes with whom he won Ligue 1's Golden Boot. At a second spell at Auxerre he retained the Golden Boot in Division 1 and also won the Golden Boot for the 1997–98 UEFA Cup. That summer he started in the World Cup Final.

Guivarc'h left France for Newcastle United of the Premier League after the World Cup but left after three months having failed to make an impact at St James' Park. He finished the season at Rangers of the Scottish Premier League with medals in the league and Scottish League Cup, of which he scored in the final. He then returned to Auxerre before retiring after the 2001–02 season with En Avant Guingamp.

== Early life ==
Guivarc'h was born in Concarneau, Finistère.

== Club career ==
=== Early career at Brest and Guingamp ===
Guivarc'h's career started at the Breton club Brest in 1989. Following back to back relegation due to their financial predicament, and the club's loss of Professional status in 1991, Guivarc'h signed for fellow Breton club Guingamp then playing in Division 2. After a difficult first season, Guivarc'h started to see more regular playing time in 1992–93, scoring 14 league goals in 33 appearances. However despite his personal success, Guingamp were relegated following a league restructure. Now in National 1, Guivarc'h scored a league leading 25 goals to earn Guingamp promotion at the first attempt. The following season he scored 23 goals to lead Guingamp to a second consecutive promotion. Over three seasons at Guingamp his goalscoring rate was better than one every two games (68 in 110 league games).

=== Auxerre, and Rennes loan ===
Guivarc'h success prompted interest throughout the league, but he was ultimately signed by Auxerre by Guy Roux for the 1995–96 season. He played for the club as they won a double of Ligue 1 and Coupe de France in 1995–96, under manager, but only scored three goals in 23 league appearances as he fell down the pecking order behind Lilian Laslandes following an injury.

Unhappy with his lack of opportunity, Roux agreed to a loan arrangement for Guivarc'h and he joined his third Breton club, Rennes for a single season. At Rennes he played alongside Sylvain Wiltord and Pierre-Yves André and won the Ligue 1 Golden Boot, scoring 22 goals in 36 appearances. His success garnered interest from Inter Milan, but Rennais blocked his transfer.

At the end of the season Guivarc'h considered leaving Auxerre, but Roux was able to convince him to stay - particularly as Laslandes had departed the club for Bordeaux.

=== Auxerre 1997–98 ===
Guivarc'h's Golden Boot-winning season prompted a return to Auxerre only one year after leaving them. He retained the Division 1 Golden Boot, rewarded for 21 goals in 32 league appearances.

Guivarc'h scored nine times as he helped Auxerre win the 1997 UEFA Intertoto Cup to earn a spot in the 1997–98 UEFA Cup where he netted seven times to earn its Golden Boot. The first goal came in the First Round's First leg against Deportivo La Coruña of Spain in a 2–1 win. The second leg was goalless. In the second round against OFI of Greece, he scored twice in the home leg in a 3–1 victory (Antoine Sibierski got the other goal) and once in the second in a 3–2 defeat (5–4 on aggregate). In the third round's second leg against Twente Enschede of the Netherlands, he scored an 82nd-minute penalty in the 2–0 victory at home to send Auxerre through 3–0 on aggregate.

In the quarter-finals against Lazio of Italy, Auxerre lost the first leg 1–0 away. In the second leg Guivarc'h struck twice in a 2–2 draw which meant that Lazio advanced 3–2 on aggregate.

=== Newcastle United and Rangers ===
Guivarc'h was signed for Newcastle United by their manager Kenny Dalglish in the 1998 close season. He played only four league games, despite scoring on his debut against Liverpool, and then was sold to Rangers for £3.5m on 6 November 1998 by new manager Ruud Gullit.

At Rangers he won the treble under Dick Advocaat: the Scottish Premier League, Scottish Cup and Scottish League Cup. Two days after signing, he scored two goals away at St Johnstone after coming on as a substitute in a 7–0 win. He also scored two away at Heart of Midlothian in a 3–2 win. He scored Rangers' first in the League Cup final versus St Johnstone, which they won 2–1.

=== Auxerre and Guingamp ===
After only one season at Rangers he joined Auxerre for a third spell, then for his final season as a professional returned to Guingamp once more. During his two spells at the Breton club he scored 69 goals, a club record.

== International career ==
Guivarc'h made 14 appearances for the France national team between 1997 and 1999; his only international goal came on his debut, in a 2–1 home victory in a friendly against South Africa on 11 October 1997. As a result of his domestic goalscoring record Guivarc'h was selected as the lone striker in the World Cup winning France team of 1998, with the tournament being held on home soil. Despite going scoreless throughout the competition, he played an important role in the team's victory by creating space with his movements and pressing defenders with his work-rate; his role in the team has been retroactively compared to Olivier Giroud's in France's 2018 FIFA World Cup victory. He was given the number 9 shirt by manager Aimé Jacquet and appeared in six of France's seven matches throughout the tournament. In the opening 3–0 victory over South Africa Guivarc'h was substituted for Christophe Dugarry in the 29th minute. He did not play at all in the following 4–0 victory over Saudi Arabia. He appeared as an 85th minute substitute for David Trezeguet in a 2–1 victory over Denmark in the final group stage match.

In the round of 16 against Paraguay he was substituted on in the 76th minute for his Auxerre teammate Bernard Diomède; France went on to win the match 1–0 after extra-time with a Golden goal from Laurent Blanc. Guivarc'h was yellow carded in the quarter-final against Italy and substituted in the 65th minute along with Christian Karembeu for Thierry Henry and David Trezeguet; France would win the match on penalties following a 0–0 draw after extra-time. In the semi-final versus Croatia Guivarc'h was again substituted for Trezeguet in the 68th minute as France won 2–1.

Guivarc'h would start in the final against Brazil and was substituted off in the 66th minute for Christophe Dugarry as France won 3–0.

On 13 November 1999 Guivarc'h played his final international match, playing the opening 45 minutes in a 3–0 victory over Croatia in an international friendly.

== Personal life ==
Guivarc'h was appointed a Knight of the Legion of Honour in 1998 after the World Cup victory.

Since retirement as a player, Guivarc'h has returned to his hometown of Concarneau and become a swimming pool salesman. He is married and has three children.

Despite the criticism, France's World Cup-winning manager Aimé Jacquet supported Guivarc'h's performances for his ability to contribute as a pivot despite not scoring in the tournament. He remains incredulous that the striker is perceived as a flop.

== Career statistics ==
Scores and results list France's goal tally first, score column indicates score after each Guivarc'h goal.

List of international goals scored by Stéphane Guivarc'h
No.	Date	Venue	Opponent	Score	Result	Competition	Ref.
1	11 October 1997	Stade Félix-Bollaert, Lens, France	South Africa	1–1	2–1	Friendly	

== Honours ==
Auxerre

- Division 1: 1995–96
- UEFA Intertoto Cup: 1997

Rangers

- Scottish Premier League: 1998–99
- Scottish League Cup: 1998–99

France

- FIFA World Cup: 1998

Individual

- Division 1 Golden Boot: 1996–97, 1997–98
- UEFA Cup Golden Boot: 1997–98

Orders

- Knight of the Legion of Honour: 1998
