= 1997–98 Rangers F.C. season =

Rangers
1997–98 season
- Chairman: David Murray
- Manager: Walter Smith
- Ground: Ibrox Stadium
- Scottish Premier Division: 2nd
- Scottish Cup: Runners-up
- League Cup: Quarter-finals
- Champions League: Second qualifying round
- UEFA Cup: First round
- Top goalscorer: League: Marco Negri (32); All: Marco Negri (37)
Home colours	Away colours	Third colours

The 1997–98 season was the 118th season of competitive football by Rangers.

== Overview ==
Rangers played a total of 52 competitive matches during the 1997–98 season. They went into the season in pursuit of a record tenth consecutive league title. The early season form of new signing Marco Negri gave the team fresh impetus but when manager Walter Smith announced that he would leave the club at the end of the season, the side's form dipped. Rangers finished the league on 72 points, two behind champions Celtic.

The club ended the season trophyless for the first time in twelve seasons as they lost the Scottish Cup final to Hearts 2–1 and were knocked out League Cup in the quarter-finals by Dundee United.

In Europe, the club failed to reach the Champions League group stages and fell at the first hurdle in the UEFA Cup, losing both legs 2–1 to Strasbourg.

== Transfers ==
=== In ===
Date	Player	From	Fee
29 May 1997	(Italy) Lorenzo Amoruso	(Italy) Fiorentina	£4,000,000
29 May 1997	(Norway) Ståle Stensaas	(Norway) Rosenborg	£1,650,000
10 June 1997	(Italy) Sergio Porrini	(Italy) Juventus	£3,000,000
18 June 1997	(Italy) Marco Negri	(Italy) Perugia	£3,500,000
20 June 1997	(Finland) Antti Niemi	(Denmark) Copenhagen	£700,000
1 July 1997	(Italy) Gennaro Gattuso	(Italy) Perugia	Free
1 July 1997	(Italy) Luigi Riccio	(Italy) Perugia	Free
1 July 1997	(Sweden) Jonas Thern	(Italy) Roma	Free
1 July 1997	(Australia) Tony Vidmar	(Netherlands) NAC Breda	Free
13 August 1997	(Finland) Jonatan Johansson	(Estonia) Flora Tallinn	£500,000
14 October 1997	(Scotland) Richard Gough	(United States) Kansas City Wizards	Free

=== Out ===
Date	Player	To	Fee
8 May 1997	(Scotland) Richard Gough	(United States) Kansas City Wizards	Free
12 May 1997	(Scotland) David Robertson	(England) Leeds United	£500,000
15 May 1997	(Scotland) Barry Robson	(Scotland) Inverness Caledonian Thistle	Free
31 May 1997	(England) Mark Hateley	(England) Hull City	Free
31 May 1997	(Wales) Andy Dibble	(England) Sheffield United	Free
31 May 1997	(England) Trevor Steven	Retired	
31 May 1997	(Scotland) John Brown	Retired	
30 June 1997	(Scotland) Greg Shields	(Scotland) Dunfermline Athletic	£100,000
30 October 1997	(Denmark) Erik Bo Andersen	(Denmark) Odense	£800,000
28 November 1997	(Scotland) Brian McGinty	(England) Hull City	Free
20 February 1998	(Scotland) Gary Bollan	(Scotland) St Johnstone	£100,000
26 March 1998	(England) Paul Gascoigne	(England) Middlesbrough	£3,450,000

- Expenditure: ▼£13,300,000
- Income: ▲£4,950,000
- Total loss/gain: ▼£8,350,000

== Results ==
All results are written with Rangers' score first.

=== Scottish Premier Division ===
Date	Opponent	Venue	Result	Attendance	Scorers
4 August 1997	Heart of Midlothian	H	3–1	48,257	Negri (2), Cleland
23 August 1997	Dundee United	H	5–1	48,599	Negri (5)
13 September 1997	Aberdeen	H	3–3	50,030	Negri (pen.), Albertz, Laudrup
20 September 1997	St Johnstone	A	2–0	10,093	Negri (2)
24 September 1997	Kilmarnock	A	3–0	15,367	Negri (2), Stensaas
27 September 1997	Motherwell	H	2–2	48,672	Negri, Porrini
4 October 1997	Hibernian	A	4–3	15,169	Negri (2, 1 (pen.)), Gascoigne, Albertz
18 October 1997	Dunfermline Athletic	H	7–0	50,023	Laudrup, Negri (4), Gascoigne (2)
25 October 1997	Dundee United	A	1–2	12,600	Negri
1 November 1997	Kilmarnock	H	4–1	49,413	Negri (3, 1 (pen.)), Porrini
8 November 1997	Celtic	H	1–0	50,082	Gough
15 November 1997	Aberdeen	A	1–1	18,117	Albertz
19 November 1997	Celtic	A	1–1	49,427	Negri
22 November 1997	Motherwell	A	1–1	12,018	McCoist
29 November 1997	St Johnstone	H	3–2	50,142	Gattuso, Negri (2)
7 December 1997	Hibernian	H	1–0	48,070	Negri
13 December 1997	Dunfermline Athletic	A	0–0	12,443	
20 December 1997	Heart of Midlothian	A	5–2	17,092	Durie (3), Negri (pen.), Albertz
27 December 1997	Dundee United	H	4–1	50,017	Laudrup, Cleland, Negri (2, 1 (pen.))
2 January 1998	Celtic	A	0–2	49,396	
10 January 1998	Aberdeen	H	2–0	49,502	Laudrup, Porrini
17 January 1998	Motherwell	H	1–0	49,443	Cleland
31 January 1998	St Johnstone	A	0–2	10,441	
7 February 1998	Dunfermline Athletic	H	1–1	49,019	Porrini
21 February 1998	Hibernian	A	2–1	13,968	Negri, Albertz
24 February 1998	Kilmarnock	A	1–1	15,931	Thern
28 February 1998	Heart of Midlothian	H	2–2	50,046	Albertz (2)
14 March 1998	Motherwell	A	1–2	11,779	McCoist
21 March 1998	St Johnstone	H	2–1	49,788	Negri, Thern
28 March 1998	Dunfermline Athletic	A	3–2	11,531	McCoist (2), Thern
1 April 1998	Hibernian	H	3–0	50,121	McCoist, Thern, Durie
12 April 1998	Celtic	H	2–0	50,042	Thern, Albertz
19 April 1998	Aberdeen	A	0–1	17,981	
25 April 1998	Heart of Midlothian	A	3–0	17,415	Gattuso (2), Albertz
2 May 1998	Kilmarnock	H	0–1	50,116	
9 May 1998	Dundee United	A	2–1	14,200	Laudrup, Albertz (pen.)

=== Scottish League Cup ===
Date	Round	Opponent	Venue	Result	Attendance	Scorers
7 August 1997	R2	Hamilton Academical	A	1–0	8,866	McCoist
19 August 1997	R3	Falkirk	H	4–1	43,606	McCoist (3, 1 (pen.)), Stensaas
9 September 1997	QF	Dundee United	H	0–1	44,440	

=== Scottish Cup ===
Date	Round	Opponent	Venue	Result	Attendance	Scorers
24 January 1998	R3	Hamilton Academical	A	2–1	11,915	Durie, Gough
14 February 1998	R4	Motherwell	A	2–2	12,602	Negri, Durie
17 February 1998	R4 R	Motherwell	H	3–0	42,043	Albertz (2), Durie
9 March 1998	QF	Dundee	H	0–0	40,309	
18 March 1998	QF R	Dundee	A	2–1	12,418	McCoist (2)
5 April 1998	SF	Celtic	A	2–1	48,993	McCoist, Albertz
16 May 1998	F	Heart of Midlothian	N	1–2	48,946	McCoist

=== UEFA Champions League ===
Date	Round	Opponent	Venue	Result	Attendance	Scorers
23 July 1997	QR1	(Faroe Islands) GÍ	A	5–0	2,200	Negri, Durie (2), McCoist (2)
30 July 1997	QR1	(Faroe Islands) GÍ	H	6–0	44,433	Durie, Negri (2), McCoist, Albertz, I.Ferguson
13 August 1997	QR2	(Sweden) IFK Göteborg	A	0–3	20,000	
27 August 1997	QR2	(Sweden) IFK Göteborg	H	1–1	45,585	Miller

=== UEFA Cup ===
Date	Round	Opponent	Venue	Result	Attendance	Scorers
16 September 1997	R1	(France) Strasbourg	A	1–2	12,450	Albertz (pen.)
30 September 1997	R1	(France) Strasbourg	H	1–2	40,145	Gattuso

== Appearances ==
Player	Position	Appearances	Goals
(Scotland) Andy Goram	GK	36	0
(Finland) Antti Niemi	GK	7	0
(Netherlands) Theo Snelders	GK	9	0
(Sweden) Joachim Björklund	DF	43	0
(Scotland) Gary Bollan	DF	2	0
(Scotland) Alex Cleland	DF	41	4
(Scotland) Richard Gough	DF	30	2
(Australia) Craig Moore	DF	15	3
(Federal Republic of Yugoslavia) Gordan Petrić	DF	11	0
(Italy) Sergio Porrini	DF	37	4
(Italy) Lorenzo Amoruso	DF	9	2
(Norway) Ståle Stensaas	DF	28	2
(Sweden) Jonas Thern	MF	29	4
(Australia) Tony Vidmar	DF	15	4
(Scotland) Stephen Wright	DF	1	0
(Germany) Jörg Albertz	MF	42	15
(Scotland) Ian Durrant	MF	12	0
(Scotland) Barry Ferguson	MF	11	0
(Scotland) Ian Ferguson	MF	17	3
(England) Paul Gascoigne	MF	27	3
(Italy) Rino Gattuso	MF	37	5
(Denmark) Brian Laudrup	MF	36	5
(Scotland) Stuart McCall	MF	38	2
(Scotland) Derek McInnes	MF	1	0
(Scotland) Charlie Miller	MF	11	4
(Denmark) Erik Bo Andersen	FW	1	0
(Scotland) Gordon Durie	FW	39	9
(Finland) Jonatan Johansson	FW	8	0
(Scotland) Ally McCoist	FW	26	16
(Italy) Marco Negri	FW	40	37
(Chile) Sebastián Rozental	FW	4	0
(Netherlands) Peter van Vossen	FW	3	0

== Competitions ==
=== Overall ===
Competition	First match	Last match	Starting round	Final position	Record							
Competition	First match	Last match	Starting round	Final position	Pld	W	D	L	GF	GA	GD	Win %
UEFA Champions League	23 July	27 August	First qualifying round	Second qualifying round	4	2	1	1	12	4	+8	50.00
Scottish Premier Division	4 August	9 May		Second place	36	21	9	6	76	38	+38	58.33
Scottish League Cup	14 August	24 November	Second round	Quarter-finals	3	2	0	1	5	2	+3	66.67
UEFA Cup	16 September	30 September	First round	First round	2	0	0	2	2	4	−2	0.00
Scottish Cup	24 January	16 May	Third round	Runners-up	7	4	2	1	12	7	+5	57.14
Total					52	29	12	11	107	55	+52	55.77

Source: Competitions

=== Scottish Premier Division ===
Pos	Team	Pld	W	D	L	GF	GA	GD	Pts	Qualification or relegation
1	Celtic (C)	36	22	8	6	64	24	+40	74	Qualification for the Champions League first qualifying round
2	Rangers	36	21	9	6	76	38	+38	72	Qualification for the UEFA Cup first qualifying round
3	Heart of Midlothian	36	19	10	7	70	46	+24	67	Qualification for the Cup Winners' Cup qualifying round
4	Kilmarnock	36	13	11	12	40	52	−12	50	Qualification for the UEFA Cup first qualifying round
5	St Johnstone	36	13	9	14	38	42	−4	48	

Source: Rec.Sport.Soccer Statistics Foundation
Rules for classification: 1) Points; 2) Goal difference; 3) Goals scored
(C) Champions
