= 1997–98 UEFA Champions League qualifying rounds =

European football tournament

The 1997–98 UEFA Champions League had two qualifying rounds to determine which 16 teams would play in the group stage, along with the eight teams that had qualified automatically. Teams from the higher-ranked UEFA nations received byes to the second qualifying round. Losing teams in the first qualifying round were eliminated from European competition for the season, while the losing teams from the second qualifying round were put into the draw for the first round of the 1997–98 UEFA Cup. Matches took place between 23 July and 27 August 1997.

== Teams ==
The national champions from associations 8 and below, along with all league runners-up, entered the qualifying rounds.

Key to colours
Winners of second qualifying round advanced to group stage
Losers of second qualifying round entered UEFA Cup first round

Second qualifying round
Assoc.	Team
1	(Italy) Parma
2	(Spain) Barcelona
3	(France) Paris Saint-Germain
4	(Germany) Bayer Leverkusen
5	(Netherlands) Feyenoord
6	(Portugal) Sporting CP
7	(England) Newcastle United
8	(Turkey) Galatasaray
8	(Turkey) Beşiktaş
9	(Greece) Olympiacos
10	(Austria) Wüstenrot Salzburg
11	(Russia) Spartak Moscow
12	(Belgium) Lierse
13	(Denmark) Brøndby
14	(Sweden) IFK Göteborg
15	(Norway) Rosenborg
16	(Czech Republic) Sparta Prague

First qualifying round
Assoc.	Team
17	(Switzerland) Sion
18	(Poland) Widzew Łódź
19	(Scotland) Rangers
20	(Romania) Steaua București
21	Croatia Zagreb
22	(Ukraine) Dynamo Kyiv
23	(Cyprus) Anorthosis Famagusta
24	(Israel) Beitar Jerusalem
25	(Hungary) MTK
26	(Georgia (country)) Dinamo Tbilisi
27	(Slovakia) Košice
28	(Latvia) Skonto
29	(Slovenia) Maribor
30	(Finland) Jazz
31	(Belarus) MPKC Mozyr
32	(Iceland) ÍA
33	(Bulgaria) CSKA Sofia
34	(North Macedonia) Sileks
35	(Lithuania) Kareda
36	(Moldova) Constructorul Chișinău
37	(Northern Ireland) Crusaders
39	(Wales) Barry Town
40	(Federal Republic of Yugoslavia) Partizan
41	(Estonia) Lantana
42	(Malta) Valletta
43	(Republic of Ireland) Derry City
44	(Armenia) Pyunik
45	(Luxembourg) Jeunesse Esch
46	(Faroe Islands) GÍ
48	(Azerbaijan) Neftçi

== First qualifying round ==
=== Seeding ===
The 30 teams were divided into seeded and unseeded pots, each containing 15 teams, for the draw based on their association's ranking.

Seeded		Unseeded	
(Switzerland) Sion; (Poland) Widzew Łódź; (Scotland) Rangers; (Romania) Steaua București; Croatia Zagreb; (Ukraine) Dynamo Kyiv; (Cyprus) Anorthosis Famagusta; (Israel) Beitar Jerusalem	(Hungary) MTK; (Georgia (country)) Dinamo Tbilisi; (Slovakia) Košice; (Latvia) Skonto; (Slovenia) Maribor; (Finland) Jazz; (Belarus) MPKC Mozyr	(Iceland) ÍA; (Bulgaria) CSKA Sofia; (North Macedonia) Sileks; (Lithuania) Kareda; (Moldova) Constructorul Chișinău; (Northern Ireland) Crusaders; (Wales) Barry Town; (Federal Republic of Yugoslavia) Partizan	(Estonia) Lantana; (Malta) Valletta; (Republic of Ireland) Derry City; (Armenia) Pyunik; (Luxembourg) Jeunesse Esch; (Faroe Islands) GÍ; (Azerbaijan) Neftçi

=== Summary ===
Team 1	Agg.	Team 2	1st leg	2nd leg
Derry City (Republic of Ireland)	0–3	(Slovenia) Maribor	0–2	0–1
Pyunik (Armenia)	3–6	(Hungary) MTK	0–2	3–4
Crusaders (Northern Ireland)	2–8	(Georgia (country)) Dinamo Tbilisi	1–3	1–5
Košice (Slovakia)	4–0	(Iceland) ÍA	3–0	1–0
Partizan (Federal Republic of Yugoslavia)	1–5	Croatia Zagreb	1–0	0–5
Valletta (Malta)	1–2	(Latvia) Skonto	1–0	0–2
Sileks (North Macedonia)	1–3	(Israel) Beitar Jerusalem	1–0	0–3
Steaua București (Romania)	5–3	(Bulgaria) CSKA Sofia	3–3	2–0
Constructorul Chișinău (Moldova)	3–4	(Belarus) MPKC Mozyr	1–1	2–3
Lantana (Estonia)	0–3	(Finland) Jazz	0–2	0–1
GÍ (Faroe Islands)	0–11	(Scotland) Rangers	0–5	0–6
Neftçi (Azerbaijan)	0–10	(Poland) Widzew Łódź	0–2	0–8
Dynamo Kyiv (Ukraine)	6–0	(Wales) Barry Town	2–0	4–0
Sion (Switzerland)	5–0	(Luxembourg) Jeunesse Esch	4–0	1–0
Anorthosis Famagusta (Cyprus)	4–1	(Lithuania) Kareda	3–0	1–1

=== Matches ===
23 July 1997
20:30

Derry City (Republic of Ireland)	0–2	(Slovenia) Maribor
	Report	Židan 57'; Gajser 75'

Brandywell Stadium, Derry
Attendance: 3,120
Referee: Hans-Jürgen Weber (Germany)
30 July 1997
20:15

Maribor (Slovenia)	1–0	(Republic of Ireland) Derry City
Drobne 49'	Report

Ljudski vrt, Maribor
Attendance: 5,463
Referee: Karl-Erik Nilsson (Sweden)

Maribor won 3–0 on aggregate.

23 July 1997
16:00

Pyunik (Armenia)	0–2	(Hungary) MTK
	Report	Illés 82'; Preisinger 89'

Hrazdan Stadium, Yerevan
Attendance: 3,000
Referee: René Temmink (Netherlands)
30 July 1997
20:30

MTK (Hungary)	4–3	(Armenia) Pyunik
Illés 18'; Halmai 40'; Preisinger 46'; Kuttor 73'	Report	Sanamyan 81', 88'; Shahgeldyan 87'

Hungária körúti Stadion, Budapest
Attendance: 1,787
Referee: Gary Willard (England)

MTK won 6–3 on aggregate.

23 July 1997
20:30

Crusaders (Northern Ireland)	1–3	(Georgia (country)) Dinamo Tbilisi
Baxter 71'	Report	Kiknadze 31'; Gogichaishvili 50'; Mujiri 65'

Seaview, Belfast
Attendance: 1,500
Referee: Vítor Melo Pereira (Portugal)
30 July 1997
17:00

Dinamo Tbilisi (Georgia (country))	5–1	(Northern Ireland) Crusaders
Iashvili 20', 34'; Mujiri 44', 59'; Khomeriki 79'	Report	G. Hunter 57'

Boris Paichadze National Stadium, Tbilisi
Attendance: 11,000
Referee: Ahmet Çakar (Turkey)

Dinamo Tbilisi won 8–2 on aggregate.

23 July 1997
17:00

Košice (Slovakia)	3–0	(Iceland) ÍA
Semeník 29'; Tóth 47'; Sovič 64'	Report

Štadión Lokomotívy, Košice
Attendance: 5,747
Referee: Aron Huzu (Romania)
30 July 1997
20:30

ÍA (Iceland)	0–1	(Slovakia) Košice
	Report	Faktor 66'

Akranesvöllur, Akranes
Attendance: 600
Referee: Alan Snoddy (Northern Ireland)

Košice won 4–0 on aggregate.

23 July 1997
19:30

Partizan (Federal Republic of Yugoslavia)	1–0	Croatia Zagreb
Isailović 84'	Report

Stadion Partizan, Belgrade
Attendance: 25,534
Referee: Ryszard Wójcik (Poland)
30 July 1997
20:00

Croatia Zagreb	5–0	(Federal Republic of Yugoslavia) Partizan
Marić 12', 42'; I. Cvitanović 15', 68'; Viduka 23'	Report

Stadion Maksimir, Zagreb
Attendance: 40,000
Referee: Gilles Veissière (France)

Croatia Zagreb won 5–1 on aggregate.

23 July 1997
20:00

Valletta (Malta)	1–0	(Latvia) Skonto
Galea 15'	Report

National Stadium, Ta' Qali
Attendance: 3,535
Referee: Naoum Mintiouris (Greece)
30 July 1997
17:30

Skonto (Latvia)	2–0	(Malta) Valletta
Astafjevs 12'; Miholaps 26'	Report

Daugava Stadium, Riga
Attendance: 1,500
Referee: Lars Gerner (Denmark)

Skonto won 2–1 on aggregate.

23 July 1997
17:30

Sileks (North Macedonia)	1–0	(Israel) Beitar Jerusalem
Karanfilovski 54' (pen.)	Report

Gradski Stadion Kratovo, Kratovo
Attendance: 2,000
Referee: Eric Romain (Belgium)
30 July 1997
17:00

Beitar Jerusalem (Israel)	3–0	(North Macedonia) Sileks
Sallói 5'; Ohana 34'; Hamar 76'	Report

Teddy Stadium, Jerusalem
Attendance: 4,500
Referee: Alain Sars (France)

Beitar Jerusalem won 3–1 on aggregate.

23 July 1997
19:15

Steaua București (Romania)	3–3	(Bulgaria) CSKA Sofia
Rotariu 8'; Lăcătuș 72'; Munteanu 83'	Report	Andonov 47'; Nankov 49', 68'

Stadionul Steaua, Bucharest
Attendance: 10,000
Referee: Hellmut Krug (Germany)
30 July 1997
19:30

CSKA Sofia (Bulgaria)	0–2	(Romania) Steaua București
	Report	Șerban 34'; Reghecampf 49'

Stadion Balgarska Armia, Sofia
Attendance: 20,000
Referee: Graziano Cesari (Italy)

Steaua București won 5–3 on aggregate.

23 July 1997
18:30

Constructorul Chișinău (Moldova)	1–1	(Belarus) MPKC Mozyr
Apachiței 18'	Report	Berishvili 23' (pen.)

Stadionul Republican, Chișinău
Attendance: 4,200
Referee: Hartmut Strampe (Germany)
30 July 1997
17:30

MPKC Mozyr (Belarus)	3–2	(Moldova) Constructorul Chișinău
Dzenisyuk 7'; Lovchev 50'; Kushnir 70'	Report	Alexa 32'; Comleonoc 69'

Yunost Stadium, Mazyr
Attendance: 5,500
Referee: Alain Hamer (Luxembourg)

MPKC Mozyr won 4–3 on aggregate.

23 July 1997
17:00

Lantana (Estonia)	0–2	(Finland) Jazz
	Report	Nieminen 5', 77'

Kadriorg Stadium, Tallinn
Attendance: 466
Referee: Tom Henning Øvrebø (Norway)
30 July 1997
17:30

Jazz (Finland)	1–0	(Estonia) Lantana
Marco 59'	Report

Porin stadion, Pori
Attendance: 3,760
Referee: Vladimír Hriňák (Slovakia)

Jazz won 3–0 on aggregate.

23 July 1997
20:00

GÍ (Faroe Islands)	0–5	(Scotland) Rangers
	Report	Negri 18'; Durie 25', 80'; McCoist 57', 90'

Svangaskarð, Toftir
Attendance: 2,500
Referee: Mikko Vuorela (Finland)
30 July 1997
20:45

Rangers (Scotland)	6–0	(Faroe Islands) GÍ
Durie 22'; Negri 42', 90'; McCoist 48'; Albertz 58'; I. Ferguson 85'	Report

Ibrox Stadium, Glasgow
Attendance: 44,433
Referee: Romāns Lajuks (Latvia)

Rangers won 11–0 on aggregate.

23 July 1997
15:00

Neftçi (Azerbaijan)	0–2	(Poland) Widzew Łódź
	Report	Terlecki 21'; Dembiński 44'

Tofiq Bahramov Republican Stadium, Baku
Attendance: 5,000
Referee: Dermot Gallagher (England)
30 July 1997
20:00

Widzew Łódź (Poland)	8–0	(Azerbaijan) Neftçi
Szarpak 6', 70' (pen.), 76'; Kobylański 8'; Zając 15'; Dembiński 25', 30'; Curteian 66'	Report

Widzew Łódź Stadium, Łódź
Attendance: 4,769
Referee: Atanas Uzunov (Bulgaria)

Widzew Łódź won 10–0 on aggregate.

23 July 1997
19:00

Dynamo Kyiv (Ukraine)	2–0	(Wales) Barry Town
Rebrov 19'; Maksymov 79'	Report

Dynamo Stadium, Kyiv
Attendance: 12,000
Referee: Oğuz Sarvan (Turkey)
30 July 1997
19:30

Barry Town (Wales)	0–4	(Ukraine) Dynamo Kyiv
	Report	Byalkevich 52'; Maksymov 64', 77'; Vashchuk 79'

Jenner Park Stadium, Barry
Attendance: 2,380
Referee: Gylfi Orrason (Iceland)

Dynamo Kyiv won 6–0 on aggregate.

23 July 1997
20:00

Sion (Switzerland)	4–0	(Luxembourg) Jeunesse Esch
Lipawsky 5', 45'; Seoane 15'; Derivaz 61'	Report

Stade de Tourbillon, Sion
Attendance: 7,000
Referee: Amit Klein (Israel)
30 July 1997
18:30

Jeunesse Esch (Luxembourg)	0–1	(Switzerland) Sion
	Report	Zambaz 89'

Stade de la Frontière, Esch-sur-Alzette
Attendance: 1,600
Referee: Pavlín Jirků (Czech Republic)

Sion won 5–0 on aggregate.

23 July 1997
17:00

Anorthosis Famagusta (Cyprus)	3–0	(Lithuania) Kareda
Krčmarević 21'; Okkas 50', 81'	Report

Antonis Papadopoulos Stadium, Larnaca
Attendance: 5,457
Referee: Charles Agius (Malta)
30 July 1997
16:30

Kareda (Lithuania)	1–1	(Cyprus) Anorthosis Famagusta
Mikalajūnas 24'	Report	Mihajlović 16'

Šiauliai Central Stadium, Šiauliai
Attendance: 4,500
Referee: Graham Poll (England)

Anorthosis Famagusta won 4–1 on aggregate.

== Second qualifying round ==
=== Seeding ===
The 32 teams were divided into seeded and unseeded pots, each containing 16 teams, for the draw based on their association's ranking.

Seeded		Unseeded	
(Italy) Parma; (Spain) Barcelona; (France) Paris Saint-Germain; (Germany) Bayer Leverkusen; (Netherlands) Feyenoord; (Portugal) Sporting CP; (England) Newcastle United; (Turkey) Galatasaray	(Turkey) Beşiktaş; (Greece) Olympiacos; (Austria) Wüstenrot Salzburg; (Russia) Spartak Moscow; (Belgium) Lierse; (Denmark) Brøndby; (Sweden) IFK Göteborg; (Norway) Rosenborg	(Czech Republic) Sparta Prague; (Switzerland) Sion; (Poland) Widzew Łódź; (Scotland) Rangers; (Romania) Steaua București; Croatia Zagreb; (Ukraine) Dynamo Kyiv; (Cyprus) Anorthosis Famagusta	(Israel) Beitar Jerusalem; (Hungary) MTK; (Georgia (country)) Dinamo Tbilisi; (Slovakia) Košice; (Latvia) Skonto; (Slovenia) Maribor; (Finland) Jazz; (Belarus) MPKC Mozyr

Notes

1. ^{†} Winners of the first qualifying round, whose identity was not known at the time of draw.

=== Summary ===
The losing teams qualified for the first round of the 1997–98 UEFA Cup.

Team 1	Agg.	Team 2	1st leg	2nd leg
Beşiktaş (Turkey)	3–1	(Slovenia) Maribor	0–0	3–1
MTK (Hungary)	1–4	(Norway) Rosenborg	0–1 (Note: The original first leg of the MTK v Rosenborg tie was abandoned in the 68th minute with MTK leading 3–2, and replayed from scratch a day later.)	1–3
Sion (Switzerland)	2–8	(Turkey) Galatasaray	1–4	1–4
Olympiacos (Greece)	7–2	(Belarus) MPKC Mozyr	5–0	2–2
Wüstenrot Salzburg (Austria)	0–3	(Czech Republic) Sparta Prague	0–0	0–3
IFK Göteborg (Sweden)	4–1	(Scotland) Rangers	3–0	1–1
Barcelona (Spain)	4–2	(Latvia) Skonto	3–2	1–0
Brøndby (Denmark)	3–4	(Ukraine) Dynamo Kyiv	2–4	1–0
Newcastle United (England)	4–3	Croatia Zagreb	2–1	2–2 (a.e.t.)
Feyenoord (Netherlands)	8–3	(Finland) Jazz	6–2	2–1
Bayer Leverkusen (Germany)	6–2	(Georgia (country)) Dinamo Tbilisi	6–1	0–1
Košice (Slovakia)	2–1	(Russia) Spartak Moscow	2–1	0–0
Steaua București (Romania)	3–5	(France) Paris Saint-Germain	3–0 (Note: The match was awarded to Steaua București after Paris Saint-Germain fielded an ineligible player.)	0–5
Widzew Łódź (Poland)	1–7	(Italy) Parma	1–3	0–4
Beitar Jerusalem (Israel)	0–3	(Portugal) Sporting CP	0–0	0–3
Anorthosis Famagusta (Cyprus)	2–3	(Belgium) Lierse	2–0	0–3

=== Matches ===
13 August 1997
20:00

Beşiktaş (Turkey)	0–0	(Slovenia) Maribor
	Report

Ali Sami Yen Stadium, Istanbul
Attendance: 11,034
Referee: Gilles Veissière (France)
27 August 1997
20:30

Maribor (Slovenia)	1–3	(Turkey) Beşiktaş
Židan 86'	Report	Özdilek 45'; Amokachi 60'; Havutçu 62'

Ljudski vrt, Maribor
Attendance: 7,000
Referee: Pierluigi Collina (Italy)

Beşiktaş won 3–1 on aggregate.

13 August 1997
20:30

MTK (Hungary)	Abandoned (Note: The first match was abandoned after 68 minutes because the lights went out in the stadium. The leg was replayed from scratch a day later.) (3–2)	(Norway) Rosenborg
Egressy 10', 45'; Kenesei 49'	Report	Rushfeldt 14'; Brattbakk 30'

Hungária körúti Stadion, Budapest
Attendance: 6,000
Referee: Ahmet Çakar (Turkey)
14 August 1997
18:00

MTK (Hungary)	0–1	(Norway) Rosenborg
	Report	Rushfeldt 87'

Hungária körúti Stadion, Budapest
Attendance: 3,400
Referee: Ahmet Çakar (Turkey)
27 August 1997
20:30

Rosenborg (Norway)	3–1	(Hungary) MTK
Jakobsen 14' (pen.), 17'; Brattbakk 83'	Report	Kuttor 77'

Lerkendal Stadion, Trondheim
Attendance: 15,014
Referee: Serge Muhmenthaler (Switzerland)

Rosenborg won 4–1 on aggregate.

13 August 1997
20:00

Sion (Switzerland)	1–4	(Turkey) Galatasaray
Lonfat 32'	Report	Hagi 5'; Erdem 9'; Ilie 61'; Kaya 86'

Stade de Tourbillon, Sion
Attendance: 12,500
Referee: Nikolai Levnikov (Russia)
27 August 1997
15:30 (16:30 UTC+3)

Galatasaray (Turkey)	4–1	(Switzerland) Sion
Ilie 41', 52', 56'; Akyel 61'	Report	Ouattara 90'

Ali Sami Yen Stadium, Istanbul
Attendance: 24,000
Referee: Mario van der Ende (Netherlands)

Galatasaray won 8–2 on aggregate.

13 August 1997
20:15

Olympiacos (Greece)	5–0	(Belarus) MPKC Mozyr
Niniadis 51'; Gogić 61', 68'; Georgatos 76'; Alexandris 88'	Report

Olympic Stadium, Athens
Attendance: 27,470
Referee: Rune Pedersen (Norway)
27 August 1997
15:30

MPKC Mozyr (Belarus)	2–2	(Greece) Olympiacos
Berishvili 3'; Kushnir 19'	Report	Anatolakis 9'; Niniadis 53'

Yunost Stadium, Mazyr
Attendance: 4,300
Referee: Hermann Albrecht (Germany)

Olympiacos won 7–2 on aggregate.

13 August 1997
19:00

Wüstenrot Salzburg (Austria)	0–0	(Czech Republic) Sparta Prague
	Report

Lehener Stadion, Salzburg
Attendance: 6,500
Referee: Manuel Díaz Vega (Spain)
27 August 1997
20:30

Sparta Prague (Czech Republic)	3–0	(Austria) Wüstenrot Salzburg
Baranek 28'; Lokvenc 42'; Z. Svoboda 66'	Report

Stadion Letná, Prague
Attendance: 15,628
Referee: László Vágner (Hungary)

Sparta Prague won 3–0 on aggregate.

13 August 1997
18:00

IFK Göteborg (Sweden)	3–0	(Scotland) Rangers
Petterson 55'; Karlsson 57'; Eriksson 89'	Report

Ullevi, Gothenburg
Attendance: 23,126
Referee: Vítor Melo Pereira (Portugal)
27 August 1997
19:45

Rangers (Scotland)	1–1	(Sweden) IFK Göteborg
Miller 23'	Report	R. Andersson 49'

Ibrox Stadium, Glasgow
Attendance: 45,585
Referee: Bernd Heynemann (Germany)

IFK Göteborg won 4–1 on aggregate.

13 August 1997
21:30

Barcelona (Spain)	3–2	(Latvia) Skonto
Giovanni 27', 70'; Stoichkov 90' (pen.)	Report	Babičevs 26'; Miholaps 46'

Camp Nou, Barcelona
Attendance: 50,000
Referee: Fernand Meese (Belgium)
27 August 1997
20:00

Skonto (Latvia)	0–1	(Spain) Barcelona
	Report	Anderson 50'

Daugava Stadium, Riga
Attendance: 13,000
Referee: Terje Hauge (Norway)

Barcelona won 4–2 on aggregate.

13 August 1997
20:05

Brøndby (Denmark)	2–4	(Ukraine) Dynamo Kyiv
Bagger 21'; Daugaard 88' (pen.)	Report	Husin 7'; Shevchenko 34'; Rebrov 76'; Holovko 78'

Brøndby Stadium, Brøndbyvester
Attendance: 10,318
Referee: Armand Ancion (Belgium)
27 August 1997
19:00

Dynamo Kyiv (Ukraine)	0–1	(Denmark) Brøndby
	Report	Colding 18'

Dynamo Stadium, Kyiv
Attendance: 17,000
Referee: Stefano Braschi (Italy)

Dynamo Kyiv won 4–3 on aggregate.

13 August 1997
21:05

Newcastle United (England)	2–1	Croatia Zagreb
Beresford 22', 76'	Report	I. Cvitanović 52'

St James' Park, Newcastle upon Tyne
Attendance: 34,465
Referee: Václav Krondl (Czech Republic)
27 August 1997
20:15

Croatia Zagreb	2–2 (a.e.t.)	(England) Newcastle United
D. Šimić 58'; I. Cvitanović 90+2'	Report	Asprilla 44' (pen.); Ketsbaia 119'

Stadion Maksimir, Zagreb
Attendance: 34,000
Referee: Urs Meier (Switzerland)

Newcastle United won 4–3 on aggregate.

13 August 1997
20:00

Feyenoord (Netherlands)	6–2	(Finland) Jazz
Van Gastel 14' (pen.), 66' (pen.); Vos 22', 39'; Sánchez 57'; Van Bronckhorst 85'	Report	Marco 29', 70'

De Kuip, Rotterdam
Attendance: 24,330
Referee: Alfredo Trentalange (Italy)
27 August 1997
20:00

Jazz (Finland)	1–2	(Netherlands) Feyenoord
Laaksonen 37'	Report	Boateng 21'; Van Gastel 90'

Tampereen stadion, Tampere
Attendance: 2,720
Referee: Aron Huzu (Romania)

Feyenoord won 8–3 on aggregate.

13 August 1997
20:30

Bayer Leverkusen (Germany)	6–1	(Georgia (country)) Dinamo Tbilisi
Lehnhoff 5'; Ramelow 44'; Meijer 47', 62'; Kirsten 56'; Rink 85'	Report	Iashvili 59'

Ulrich-Haberland-Stadion, Leverkusen
Attendance: 20,500
Referee: Peter Mikkelsen (Denmark)
27 August 1997
17:45

Dinamo Tbilisi (Georgia (country))	1–0	(Germany) Bayer Leverkusen
Mujiri 11'	Report

Boris Paichadze National Stadium, Tbilisi
Attendance: 12,000
Referee: Paul Durkin (England)

Bayer Leverkusen won 6–2 on aggregate.

13 August 1997
19:00

Košice (Slovakia)	2–1	(Russia) Spartak Moscow
Kožlej 15'; I. Kozák 42' (pen.)	Report	Dmitriyev 37'

Štadión Lokomotívy, Košice
Attendance: 9,270
Referee: Charles Agius (Malta)
27 August 1997
17:00

Spartak Moscow (Russia)	0–0	(Slovakia) Košice
	Report

Lokomotiv Stadium, Moscow
Attendance: 22,000
Referee: Michel Piraux (Belgium)

Košice won 2–1 on aggregate.

13 August 1997
18:30

Steaua București (Romania)	3–0 Awarded (Note: The Steaua București v Paris Saint-Germain first leg match, which originally finished 3–2 to Steaua București, was awarded 3–0 to Steaua București because Paris Saint-Germain fielded an ineligible player.)	(France) Paris Saint-Germain
Rotariu 53' (pen.); Șerban 70'; Lăcătuș 77'	Report	Guérin 18'; Maurice 64'

Stadionul Steaua, Bucharest
Attendance: 20,500
Referee: José María García-Aranda (Spain)
27 August 1997
20:45

Paris Saint-Germain (France)	5–0	(Romania) Steaua București
Raí 2' (pen.), 21', 55'; Simone 30'; Maurice 40'	Report

Parc des Princes, Paris
Attendance: 42,585
Referee: Dick Jol (Netherlands)

Paris Saint-Germain won 5–3 on aggregate.

13 August 1997
20:30

Widzew Łódź (Poland)	1–3	(Italy) Parma
Mikhalchuk 52'	Report	Chiesa 27', 47', 49'

Widzew Łódź Stadium, Łódź
Attendance: 12,453
Referee: Marc Batta (France)
27 August 1997
21:00

Parma (Italy)	4–0	(Poland) Widzew Łódź
Pedros 36'; Sensini 41', 52'; Adaílton 78'	Report

Stadio Ennio Tardini, Parma
Attendance: 25,000
Referee: Hugh Dallas (Scotland)

Parma won 7–1 on aggregate.

13 August 1997
17:00

Beitar Jerusalem (Israel)	0–0	(Portugal) Sporting CP
	Report

Teddy Stadium, Jerusalem
Attendance: 7,400
Referee: Günter Benkö (Austria)
27 August 1997
22:00

Sporting CP (Portugal)	3–0	(Israel) Beitar Jerusalem
Yordanov 4'; Leandro 55', 68'	Report

Estádio José Alvalade, Lisbon
Attendance: 50,000
Referee: Leif Sundell (Sweden)

Sporting CP won 3–0 on aggregate.

13 August 1997
20:00

Anorthosis Famagusta (Cyprus)	2–0	(Belgium) Lierse
Okkas 43'; Mihajlović 89'	Report

Antonis Papadopoulos Stadium, Larnaca
Attendance: 7,456
Referee: Alain Sars (France)
27 August 1997
20:30

Lierse (Belgium)	3–0	(Cyprus) Anorthosis Famagusta
Van Meir 21' (pen.); Hasenhüttl 47'; Tomić 84' (o.g.)	Report

Herman Vanderpoortenstadion, Lier
Attendance: 6,000
Referee: Ľuboš Micheľ (Slovakia)

Lierse won 3–2 on aggregate.
