= Gennaro Gattuso =

Italian football manager and former player (born 1978)

Gennaro Gattuso Ufficiale OMRI
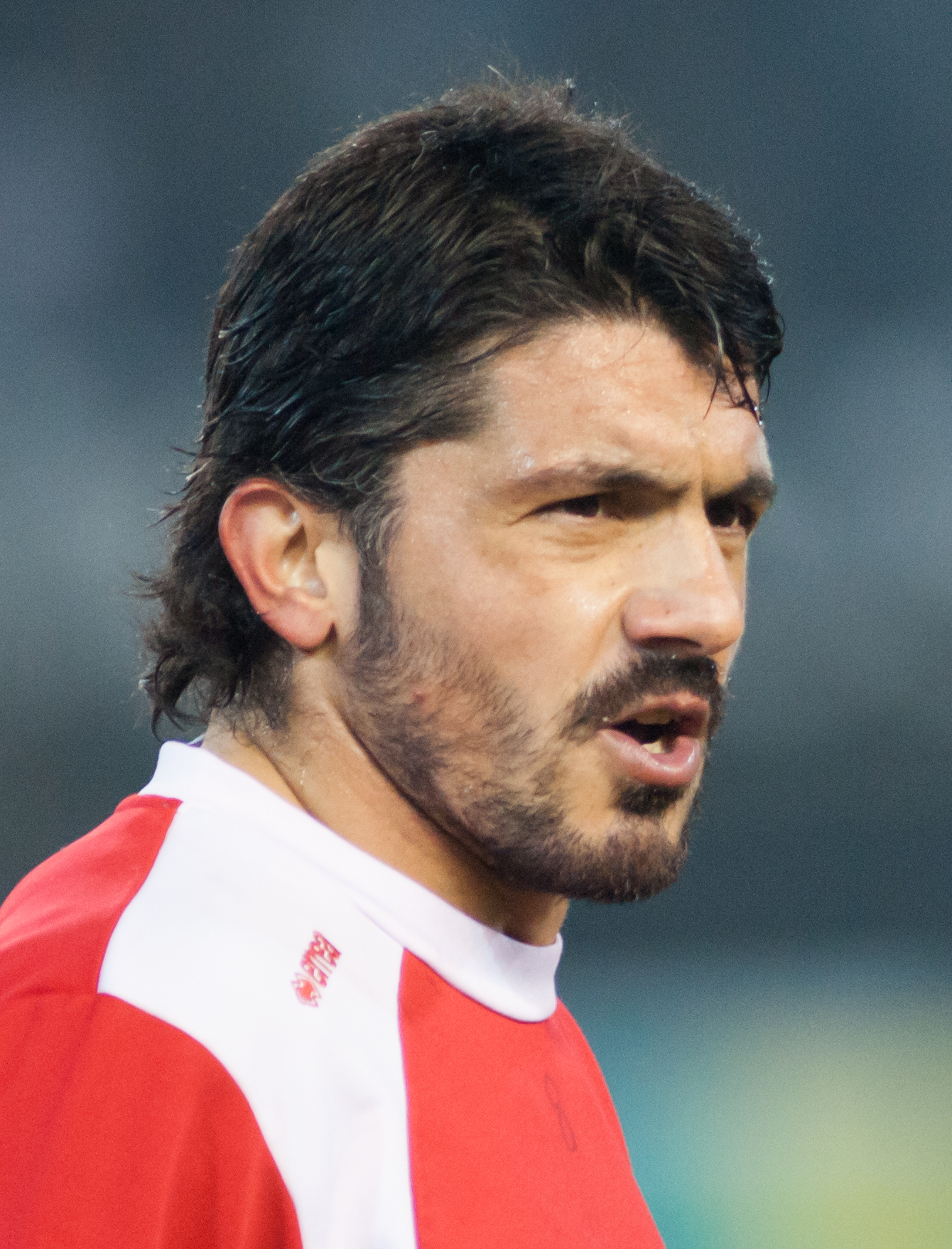
- Gattuso in 2013

Personal information
- Full name: Gennaro Ivan Gattuso
- Date of birth: 9 January 1978 (age 48)
- Place of birth: Corigliano Calabro, Cosenza, Italy
- Height: 1.77 m (5 ft 10 in)
- Position: Midfielder

Team information
- Current team: Lazio (head coach)

Youth career
- 1990–1995: Perugia

Senior career*
Years	Team	Apps	(Gls)
1995–1997	Perugia	10	(0)
1997–1998	Rangers	34	(3)
1998–1999	Salernitana	25	(0)
1999–2012	AC Milan	335	(9)
2012–2013	Sion	27	(1)
Total		403	(13)

International career
1995–1996	Italy U18	14	(3)
1998–2000	Italy U21	21	(1)
2000	Italy Olympic	3	(0)
2000–2010	Italy	73	(1)

Managerial career
- 2013: Sion
- 2013: Palermo
- 2014: OFI
- 2015–2016: Pisa
- 2016–2017: Pisa
- 2017–2019: AC Milan
- 2019–2021: Napoli
- 2021: Fiorentina
- 2022–2023: Valencia
- 2023–2024: Marseille
- 2024–2025: Hajduk Split
- 2025–2026: Italy
- 2026–: Lazio
Medal record
Men's football
Representing Italy
FIFA World Cup
Winner	2006 Germany
UEFA European Under-21 Championship
Winner	2000 Slovakia
- * Club domestic league appearances and goals

Gennaro Ivan Gattuso Ufficiale OMRI (Italian pronunciation: [dʒenˈnaːro ɡatˈtuːzo]; born 9 January 1978) is an Italian professional football manager and former player who is currently the head coach of Lazio.

As a player, Gattuso mainly played in the centre as a defensive midfielder, although he was also capable of playing out wide. He initially played for Perugia, Salernitana and Rangers, though he is mostly remembered for his time with AC Milan in Serie A, where he won the UEFA Champions League in 2002–03 and 2006–07, the Coppa Italia in 2002–03, and also the Serie A title in 2003–04 and 2010–11. In addition to these titles, he also won two Italian Supercups, two UEFA Supercups, and a FIFA Club World Cup. At international level, Gattuso played for the Italy national football team at the 2000 Summer Olympics, three FIFA World Cups, two UEFA European Championships, and the 2009 FIFA Confederations Cup.

Gattuso's talismanic midfield partnership with playmaker Andrea Pirlo, both at club and international level, played a key role in Italy's World Cup victory in 2006, as well as Milan's domestic, European and international successes during the mid-2000s. Despite not being blessed with notable technical skills, Gattuso's pace, strength and work-rate complemented and supported Pirlo's composed, creative playing style. In addition to his ball-winning abilities, Gattuso was renowned for his competitive nature and leadership qualities throughout his career, often wearing the captain's armband for Milan following Paolo Maldini's retirement in 2009.

Gattuso's managerial career began as player-coach of his final club, Sion of the Swiss Super League, and he also had short spells in charge of Palermo and OFI. In June 2016, he led Pisa to Serie B promotion. He later coached both the youth side and the first team of his former club Milan between 2017 and 2019, before being appointed as manager of Napoli later that year, where he won his first title as a manager, the 2019–20 Coppa Italia. He then had a brief managerial stint at Fiorentina, resigning after 22 days due to disagreements with the club's board. He was then appointed manager of Spanish La Liga club Valencia but was sacked in January 2023. In September 2023, Gattuso took charge of French Ligue 1 club Marseille before being sacked in February 2024. He subsequently took over at Croatian club Hajduk Split in June 2024 and left after one season in charge. Following that, he was appointed as coach of the Italian national team in June 2025, but resigned in April 2026, following failure to reach the World Cup for the third time in a row after a play-off loss to Bosnia and Herzegovina.

== Club career ==
=== Early career ===
Gattuso was born in Corigliano Calabro, Italy. He started his career with Umbrian side Perugia, but transferred in July 1997, at the age of 19, to the Scottish team Rangers. The move was controversial; Perugia, unsuccessfully, accused Rangers of signing Gattuso illegally and took their case to FIFA. Gattuso revealed that he initially refused to join Rangers but accepted the move after his father persuaded him to move.

Gattuso made his debut for Rangers, coming on as an 81st-minute substitute, in a 3–1 win against Hearts in the opening game of the season. He scored his first goal for the club against Strasbourg in the first round of the UEFA Cup, as Rangers failed to overcome the deficit, losing 4–2 on aggregate. Gattuso received a red card for the first time in his professional career over a second bookable offence, in a 5–2 win against Hearts on 20 December 1997. He later scored two more goals for the club, including a brace against Hearts on 25 April 1998. This led him to being described as one of the club's "unsung heroes" by its chairman David Murray, who felt that Gattuso had "surpassed expectations by playing so many games aged 19". In the Scottish Cup final, Gattuso played the whole game, as Rangers lost 2–1 against Hearts. At the end of the 1997–98 season, he had made 40 appearances and scoring four times in all competitions.

Walter Smith, who brought Gattuso to Glasgow, left the club in 1998. Smith's successor, Dick Advocaat, did not favour Gattuso and played him out-of-position as a right-back. Despite this, he was able to score in the UEFA Cup 4–2 win against Beitar Jerusalem. The Italian was sold in October 1998 to then-recently promoted Serie A club Salernitana for £4 million. Prior to joining Salernitana, Gattuso turned down a move to Juventus.

=== AC Milan ===
Gattuso was bought by AC Milan for €8 million from Salernitana in the summer of 1999. He made his debut with the club on 15 September 1999, in a 0–0 away draw with Chelsea in the UEFA Champions League; he soon broke into the starting line-up that season, also playing his first Milan-derby match on 24 October 1999, in which he stood out and immediately endeared himself with the Milan fans for the maturity and tenacity he demonstrated when facing Inter striker Ronaldo, who was widely regarded as the best player in the world at the time.

During his time at the club, Gattuso's work-rate and versatility as a ball-winner later allowed Milan manager Carlo Ancelotti to place midfield playmaker Andrea Pirlo alongside him in a more creative, attacking position, while Gattuso supported him in a deeper role, as a defensive midfielder; this midfield partnership was pivotal to Milan's domestic and international successes under Ancelotti, which included the Coppa Italia, the UEFA Champions League and the UEFA Super Cup in 2003, as well as the Serie A title and the Supercoppa Italiana in 2004. Gattuso signed a contract extension with Milan in June 2003 and in October 2004. During this period, Gattuso also reached the 2005 UEFA Champions League final with Milan, only to be defeated by Liverpool on penalties, after initially leading 3–0 at half-time.

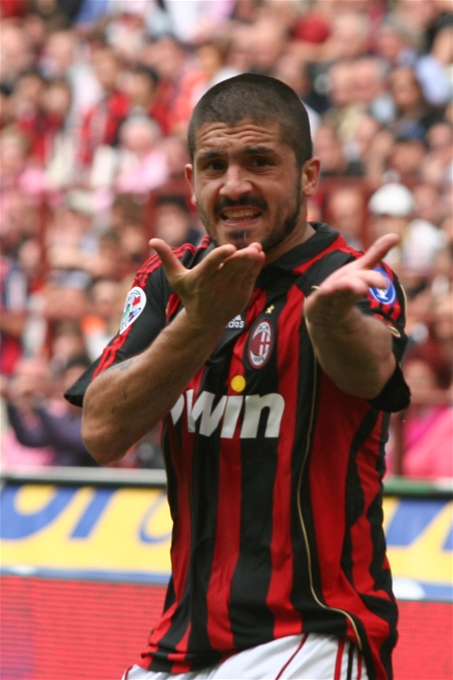
Gattuso in May 2007

Gattuso played his 300th game for the club in a goalless Champions League draw against Lille on 26 September 2006, and he extended his current deal with Milan until 2011 on 1 February 2007. On 23 May 2007, Gattuso won the Champions League for the second time in his career when Milan beat Liverpool 2–1 in the final.

After winning the FIFA Club World Cup, on 27 December 2007, Gattuso trained with his former club Rangers to regain fitness during the Serie A winter break while his wife was visiting family in Scotland over Christmas. The following December, Gattuso suffered a torn Anterior cruciate ligament early on in the 1–0 league win against Catania. Despite the injury, however, Gattuso played the entire 90 minutes before being diagnosed by the club doctors after the match. He underwent surgery to repair the damage on 19 December 2008 in Antwerp, Belgium. He was expected to miss up to six months of action but managed to return to the Milan bench on 10 May against Juventus, a month ahead of schedule.

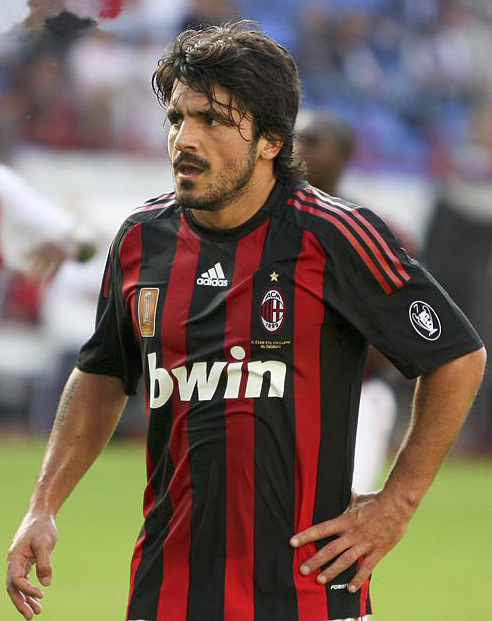
Gattuso in 2008

On 22 August 2009, he made his 400th appearance with Milan in the opening match of the 2009–10 Serie A season against Siena, wearing the captain's armband. It was confirmed by Milan on 14 December 2009 that Gattuso would remain a Milan player until 30 June 2012, after adding one more year to his current contract.

The 2010–11 season with Milan was one of Gattuso's best seasons of his career, and saw him end a three-year goal drought with a left-footed strike from outside the box, which proved to be the decisive goal in a 1–0 victory over Juventus on 5 March 2011. Gattuso later celebrated another goal in a 4–1 victory against Cagliari with a long-distance header that beat the goalkeeper, who was off his line. Gattuso celebrated Milan's 18th Scudetto victory after a scoreless draw against Roma on 7 May.

Gattuso had been experiencing vision problems in early September 2011, a few days before the season kicked off. On 9 September 2011, Gattuso crashed into teammate Alessandro Nesta while playing against Lazio in Milan's opening Serie A game of the 2011–12 season. He was substituted off directly afterward in the 20th minute and diagnosed with a left sixth cranial nerve palsy, resulting in double vision, an injury that could have ended his football career. He later revealed that he had seen teammate Zlatan Ibrahimović in four different positions during the opening stages of the match, and was unable to see Nesta, resulting in the pair's clash.

On 11 May 2012, Gattuso confirmed that he would not renew his contract with the club which was due to expire on 30 June and that he would be leaving Milan at the end of the season.

=== Sion ===
On 15 June 2012, after being released by Milan, Gattuso joined Swiss club Sion. He had been linked with a deal to join former club Rangers in Scotland, but the deal fell through because of the club's financial difficulties. On 25 February 2013, Gattuso was named as the new manager of Sion after manager Víctor Muñoz was demoted to a scouting role after a 4–0 defeat by Thun in the Swiss Super League.

=== Controversies ===
In a UEFA Champions League group stage match against Ajax in September 2003, he was sent off during second-half injury time after slapping Ajax striker Zlatan Ibrahimović in the face with the back of his hand. His temper caused him further problems when in December 2005, at the final whistle of Milan's 3–2 defeat of Schalke 04 in the Champions League, Gattuso was seen seeking out and taunting Schalke's midfielder Christian Poulsen as a reaction to Poulsen's fierce marking of Kaká in the first leg. Gattuso insisted, however, that the press exaggerated the significance of the incident.

On 15 February 2011, during Milan's Champions League game against Tottenham Hotspur, Gattuso pushed Tottenham coach Joe Jordan away by the throat during an incident on the sideline. Jordan was seen outside his allowed technical area exchanging words with Gattuso, in relation to the relatively physical game that had been played. After the game, after Gattuso had shaken hands with the Tottenham players, video footage showed him confronting Jordan and head-butting him after another exchange of words, before being restrained by both teammates and opponents. "I lost control. There is no excuse for what I did. I take my responsibilities for that", said the 33-year-old Gattuso, but he also said Jordan provoked him throughout the game but refused to say what his comments were. Newspapers, however, reported Joe Jordan had been using racist, offensive calls for much of the game by calling Gattuso a "fucking Italian bastard" from the sidelines. The following day, it was announced that UEFA was looking at additional sanctions or punishment for Gattuso's actions against Jordan the previous day and had been charged with "gross unsporting conduct." Gattuso was then suspended for five Champions League matches – one for yellow card accumulation, the other four for the incident with Jordan. The Tottenham coach also received a touchline ban by UEFA for his involvement in the exchange.

== International career ==
=== Youth ===
Gattuso represented the Italy under-18 side (Note: Italy national "under-18" football team before 2001 is equivalent to current Italy national under-19 football team, due to the name change of UEFA European Under-18 Football Championship, to reflect the age limit at the end of tournament, not start of tournament) at the 1995 UEFA European Under-18 Football Championship, where Italy finished in second place to Spain following a 4–1 final defeat; he also represented the Italy under-21 side at the 2000 UEFA European Under-21 Football Championship, where Italy went on to win the tournament with a 2–1 victory over the Czech Republic in the final.

=== Senior ===
Gattuso earned 73 appearances for his country at senior level and played in the 2000 Summer Olympics, the 2002 World Cup, Euro 2004, the 2006 World Cup, Euro 2008, the 2009 Confederations Cup, and the 2010 World Cup. On 23 February 2000, he debuted under Dino Zoff at the age of 22 in a 1–0 friendly home victory over Sweden, on 23 February 2000. The same year on 15 November, he made his first start for Italy later that year under Giovanni Trapattoni scoring the only goal in a 1–0 friendly home victory over England with a powerful strike from outside the area; this was his first and only goal for Italy.

==== 2002 FIFA World Cup and UEFA Euro 2004 ====
Gattuso made two substitute appearances at the 2002 World Cup, first in his nation's 2–0 opening group win against Ecuador, and secondly in Italy's controversial 2–1 extra-time defeat to co-hosts South Korea in the round of 16 of the competition. He also later appeared in Italy's two opening group matches at Euro 2004, against Denmark (0–0) and Sweden (1–1), but missed out on Italy's final match against Bulgaria (2–1) due to a suspension following an accumulation of two yellow cards in the first two matches of the competition; despite a 2–1 victory, Italy were eliminated from the tournament in the first round on direct encounters, following a three-way five-point tie with Denmark and Sweden.

==== 2006 FIFA World Cup ====
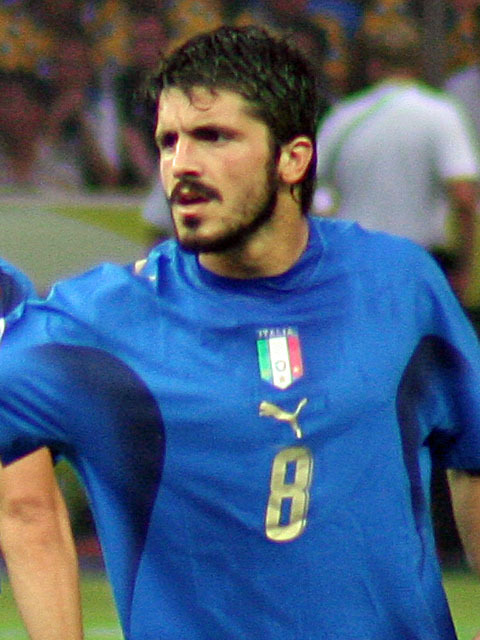
Gattuso playing for Italy in the 2006 FIFA World Cup final

Gattuso was named to Italy's 23-man squad for the 2006 World Cup, and was one of the key players in Italy's eventual victory in the tournament under manager Marcello Lippi; he won the Man of the Match award for his performance in his nation's 3–0 victory in the quarter-finals of the tournament, against Ukraine. He and Andrea Pirlo formed a formidable partnership in the heart of midfield, with Gattuso supporting Pirlo's creative playmaking duties with his work-rate and ability to break down possession. While Pirlo finished as one of the top assist providers in the tournament, Gattuso won more challenges than any other player in the tournament (47 – 11 more than Patrick Vieira in second place) and completed 351 passes out of the 392 he attempted; he also provided an assist during the tournament, helping to set up Filippo Inzaghi's goal in a 2–0 win over the Czech Republic in Italy's final group match of the tournament on 22 June. Gattuso achieved a measure of notoriety for his post-match celebrations after Italy won the World Cup final on penalties against France on 9 July, during which he removed his shorts and ran around the pitch in his underpants, until FIFA officials forced him to cover up. He was named to the tournament's All Star Team for his performances.

==== UEFA Euro 2008 ====
Under Roberto Donadoni at Euro 2008, Gattuso played in the matches against Netherlands (a 0–3 loss) and France (a 2–0 win) in the group stage, but was suspended for the quarter-final match against eventual champions Spain, along with Andrea Pirlo; in their absence, Italy went on to lose 4–2 in the ensuing penalty shoot-out after a 0–0 draw following extra-time.

On 19 November 2008, he made his first appearance as Italy's captain, taking the armband following Fabio Cannavaro's substitution in the 61st minute of a friendly against Greece. Despite having only recently recovered from a serious knee injury, Lippi included Gattuso in Italy's squad for the 2009 FIFA Confederations Cup, where they suffered a first round elimination. At the tournament, Gattuso gained notoriety against Egypt when he got tripped up by Mohamed Aboutrika, and his shorts fell down, revealing his underpants.

==== Retirement ====
In June 2010, Gattuso announced that he would retire from international duty after the 2010 FIFA World Cup in South Africa, where he participated in his nation's final group match against Slovakia – his last game for the national side, as Italy suffered a first round elimination following a 3–2 defeat.

== Style of play ==
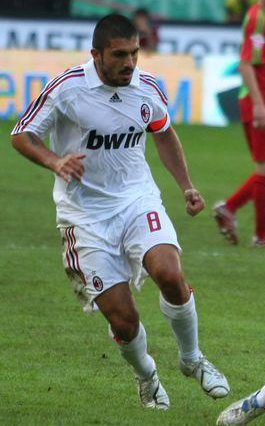
Gattuso in 2007

Considered by pundits to be one of the greatest holding midfielders of all time, throughout his career, Gattuso mainly played as a central or defensive midfielder, although he was even deployed on the right flank on occasion, either as a full-back, wing-back, or as a winger, due to his versatility. Despite not being particularly skilful from a technical standpoint (although he was able to improve in this area with time under the tutelage of Mauro Tassotti), or particularly tall, Gattuso was a physically strong, consistent, aggressive, and hard-tackling midfielder, with an extremely high work rate; he also possessed a powerful shot, and quick reactions, as well as an excellent positional sense and good anticipation, which enabled him to excel in this position; in his prime, he was widely regarded as one of the best defensive midfielders in the world. His energetic and combative box-to-box style of play, as well as his pace, tactical awareness and abilities as a ball-winner, allowed him to form a successful midfield partnership with playmaker Andrea Pirlo throughout his career, both at club and international level. Gattuso's deeper position on the pitch allowed him to support Pirlo and his other teammates defensively by breaking up the opposition's attacks; he often only advanced in order to intercept the ball and play it to one of his more creative or offensive teammates after winning back possession, subsequently returning to his more defensive midfield role. His tenacity on the pitch, exemplified by his fierce challenges and stamina, earned him the nickname Ringhio (Snarl). In addition to his footballing abilities, he also stood out for his competitive spirit, determination, and leadership.

== Managerial career ==
=== Sion ===
Gattuso started his coaching career in 2011 by attending a course for UEFA A Licence, when he still played for AC Milan. He passed the exam in July.

On 25 February 2013, Gattuso was named as the new manager of Sion after manager Víctor Muñoz was demoted to a scouting role after a 4–0 defeat by Thun in the Swiss Super League. Gattuso became the fifth manager of the club in the 2012–13 season. On 27 February 2013, Gattuso won his first match as a manager, beating Lausanne 2–0 away in a Swiss Cup match. Gattuso was sacked on 13 May 2013.

=== Palermo ===
Later in May 2013, he was heavily linked with the managerial post at Palermo, after the Sicilians were relegated to Serie B. On 3 June 2013, Maurizio Zamparini confirmed he had a verbal agreement with Gattuso, subjected to a contract release with then manager Giuseppe Sannino. The appointment was made official later on 19 June, after Gattuso rescinded his contract with Sion. Gattuso named Luigi Riccio as his assistant, with whom he worked at Sion. His experience as rosanero head coach was however short-lived, as he was sacked 25 September 2013 after achieving only two wins and a draw in the first six games of the league season.

During 2013–14 season, he also attended a course for UEFA Pro Licence, after which he passed the exam in September 2014.

=== OFI ===
On 5 June 2014, Gattuso was appointed manager of Super League Greece team OFI. While managing OFI, in the first few months there were rumours that the players and coaching staff were not getting paid due to the poor financial situation of the club. Gattuso lashed out at media saying that it was not true that he wanted to leave. Throughout the press conference, he threw out curse words and banged on the table. On 26 October 2014, Gattuso tended his resignation as head coach of OFI, following a 2–3 home loss to Asteras Tripolis, citing the club's financial difficulties as one of the main reasons behind his decision. However, on the very next day he changed his mind after having been persuaded by the club supporters and the board to stay. On 30 December 2014, Gattuso officially resigned as OFI manager, due to the club's financial problems. In January 2015, he applied for the manager's position at Scottish club Hamilton Academical following the departure of Alex Neil.

=== Pisa ===
Gattuso was appointed as the manager of the then Lega Pro side Pisa on 20 August 2015. On 12 June 2016, he led Pisa to Serie B promotion after beating out Foggia 5–3 on aggregate in the Lega Pro promotion play-off final. On 31 July however, he suddenly left Pisa, citing "serious, constant and unacceptable" problems at the club being the reason for his departure. One month after leaving the club, he re-joined Pisa as the team's head coach. However, in the following season, Pisa finished in last place with the second best defense, but the worst attack in the league, and Gattuso resigned again, this time definitely.

=== AC Milan (youth) ===
In May 2017 Gattuso was appointed as the coach of AC Milan Primavera, the under-19 team of the club. He was the third former player who won 2007 UEFA Champions League, to coach the Primavera team, after Filippo Inzaghi (2013–14) and Cristian Brocchi (2014–2016). They also coached the first team, after the sacking of Clarence Seedorf (also a former Milan player and 2007 Champions League winner) and Siniša Mihajlović respectively.

As of round 10 of the Campionato Nazionale Primavera (which ended on 26 November), the Milan Primavera side was ranked third (out of 16 teams) in the league's first division.

=== AC Milan ===
On 27 November 2017, Vincenzo Montella was sacked by AC Milan. Subsequently, they appointed Gattuso as the head coach of the first team, who left the position as the coach of the under-19s. He recorded his first win with a 2–1 home victory against Bologna in Serie A on 10 December. Milan finished the season in sixth place.

In April 2018, Gattuso's contract was extended to 2021. In his first full season in charge, Milan missed out on Champions League by one point, finishing fifth on 68 points. On 28 May 2019, he departed Milan by mutual consent.

=== Napoli ===
On 11 December 2019, Gattuso was appointed head coach of Napoli following the sacking of Carlo Ancelotti the previous day.

On 13 June 2020, Napoli achieved a 1–1 home draw with Inter in the second leg of the Coppa Italia semi-finals, which allowed them to progress to the 2020 Coppa Italia final following a 2–1 aggregate victory; Gattuso dedicated the achievement to his sister, who had recently died. On 17 June, Napoli won the final against Juventus 4–2 on penalties after a goalless draw.

On 23 May 2021, the final day of the league, Gattuso was unable to secure a fourth-place finish for Napoli after a 1–1 home draw with Verona, finishing fifth. They earned one point less than Juventus, who secured qualification to the following season's Champions League after a victory at Bologna. The club's chairman, Aurelio De Laurentiis, put an end to Gattuso's tenure as the head coach of Napoli after one year and a half.

=== Fiorentina ===
On 25 May 2021, Fiorentina announced the appointment of Gattuso as their new head coach, effective from 1 July. However, on 17 June, just two weeks before his contract was due to begin, Gattuso and Fiorentina mutually rescinded the agreement.

=== Valencia ===
On 9 June 2022, Gattuso was unveiled as the new manager of Valencia, competing in the Spanish La Liga, on a two-season deal. In the process, he became the third Italian manager to manage the club, following Claudio Ranieri and Cesare Prandelli. On 30 January 2023, he left his position at Valencia by mutual consent with the club.

=== Marseille ===
On 27 September 2023, Gattuso signed as the new manager of French Ligue 1 side Marseille. On 19 February 2024, he was sacked after five months in charge.

=== Hajduk Split ===
On 12 June 2024, Croatian Football League club Hajduk Split announced Gattuso had signed a contract with the club until 2026. In June 2025, he mutually agreed to terminate his contract with the club.

=== Italy ===
On 15 June 2025, Gattuso was announced as head coach of Italy, replacing the sacked Luciano Spalletti following a 0–3 away defeat to Norway. Gattuso's debut as Italy's commissario tecnico came on 5 September in a 5–0 win against Estonia. In November of the same year, Italy qualified for the play-offs for the third time in a row following a 4–1 home defeat to Norway.

On 27 March 2026, Italy defeated Northern Ireland in the semi-final 2–0 to advance to the final. Days later, on 31 March 2026, Italy failed to qualify for the 2026 FIFA World Cup after losing to Bosnia and Herzegovina on penalties following a 1–1 draw, marking the third straight World Cup for which they failed to qualify. Gattuso would later apologize for the defeat. On 3 April 2026, Gattuso resigned as head coach of the Italy national team.

=== Lazio ===
On 23 June 2026, Gattuso was named as the new head coach of Serie A side Lazio.

== Style of management ==
Tactically, Gattuso frequently uses the 4–3–3 formation as a manager, although he has been known to use the 3–4–3 and the 4–2–3–1. In contrast to his own defensive playing style, his teams instead tend to play out and build plays from the back, implementing a possession game based on technique and passing; his teams are also known for their intensity and team-work off the ball, using heavy pressing in order to win the ball back quickly. His style has therefore been likened to that of fellow former Napoli manager Maurizio Sarri's in the Italian media. Gattuso is also known for fostering a positive team spirit as a manager through his humour, and for placing an importance on his teams having a fighting mentality.

== Personal life ==
Gattuso is married to Monica Romano, a Scottish woman of Italian descent. Her father, Mario, was a millionaire restaurateur who died in 2011, and her sister is television presenter Carla Romano. They have two children.

In January 2010, Gattuso opened a fish shop in his home town of Corigliano Calabro, in province of Cosenza.

Gattuso is a Catholic, and when he played for Rangers, a club with a Protestant identity in the 1997–98 season, he alleged that his teammates ordered him to take off his crucifix necklace.

Gattuso's sister, Francesca, died in June 2020 at the age of 37. She had been in intensive care since February 2020.

Gattuso suffers from an auto-immune disease named ocular myasthenia since his days as a footballer. He opened up about his illness in late 2020 after he appeared on the pitch wearing an eyepatch during several games.

== Media ==
In December 2003, Gattuso participated on the Italian version of Who Wants to Be a Millionaire?, Chi vuol essere milionario?, alongside Christian Vieri during an episode organised for charity. The pair ended the game on the second-to-last question, winning €150,000. On the question before, when the pair were doubtful about the correct answer, Vincenzo Montella, one of the football players who was in the audience, invited them to walk away with €70,000 instead of taking the risk of answering incorrectly and dropping down to €16,000. Vieri playfully suggested selling the player ("Ma vendetelo!"), while Gattuso jokingly asked for Montella to be sent out of the studio as he was behaving like a jinx ("Porta una sfiga Montella, mandatelo via!").

Gattuso features in EA Sports' FIFA football video game series; he was included in the Ultimate Team Legends in FIFA 16 and later iterations of the game.

== Career statistics ==
=== Club ===
Appearances and goals by club, season and competition
Club	Season	League			National cup (Note: Includes Coppa Italia, Scottish Cup, Swiss Cup)		Europe		Other		Total	
Club	Season	Division	Apps	Goals	Apps	Goals	Apps	Goals	Apps	Goals	Apps	Goals
Perugia	1995–96	Serie B	2	0			–				2	0
Perugia	1996–97	Serie A	8	0			–				8	0
Perugia	Total		10	0			—				10	0
Rangers	1997–98	Scottish Premier Division	29	3	6	0	2	1	3	0	40	4
Rangers	1998–99	Scottish Premier Division	5	0	0	0	5	1	1	0	11	1
Rangers	Total		34	3	4	0	7	2	4	0	51	5
Salernitana	1998–99	Serie A	25	0	0	0	–				25	0
AC Milan	1999–2000	Serie A	22	1	1	0	5 (Note: Appearances in UEFA Champions League)	0	–		28	1
AC Milan	2000–01	Serie A	24	0	2	0	10	0	–		36	0
AC Milan	2001–02	Serie A	32	0	5	0	10 (Note: Appearances in UEFA Cup)	0	–		47	0
AC Milan	2002–03	Serie A	25	0	3	0	14	0	–		42	0
AC Milan	2003–04	Serie A	33	1	2	0	7	1	3 (Note: One appearance in Supercoppa Italiana, one appearance in UEFA Super Cup, one appearance in Intercontinental Cup)	0	45	2
AC Milan	2004–05	Serie A	32	0	2	0	11	0	1 (Note: Appearance in Supercoppa Italiana)	0	46	0
AC Milan	2005–06	Serie A	35	3	3	0	11	0	–		49	3
AC Milan	2006–07	Serie A	30	1	4	0	13	0	–		47	1
AC Milan	2007–08	Serie A	31	1	1	0	8	0	3 (Note: One appearance in UEFA Super Cup, two appearances in FIFA Club World Cup)	0	43	1
AC Milan	2008–09	Serie A	12	0	0	0	4	0	–		16	1
AC Milan	2009–10	Serie A	22	0	1	0	1	0	–		24	0
AC Milan	2010–11	Serie A	31	2	2	0	5	0	–		38	2
AC Milan	2011–12	Serie A	6	0				0	1	0	7	0
AC Milan	Total		335	9	26	0	99	2	8	0	468	11
Sion	2012–13	Swiss Super League	27	1	5	0	–				32	1
Career total			431	13	37	0	106	4	12	0	586	17

=== International ===
Appearances and goals by national team and year
National team	Year	Apps	Goals
Italy	2000	6	1
Italy	2001	3	0
Italy	2002	10	0
Italy	2003	4	0
Italy	2004	9	0
Italy	2005	8	0
Italy	2006	10	0
Italy	2007	6	0
Italy	2008	9	0
Italy	2009	5	0
Italy	2010	3	0
Total		73	1

Score and result list Templatonia's goal tally first, score column indicates score after Gattuso goal.

International goal scored by Gennaro Gattuso
No.	Date	Venue	Opponent	Score	Result	Competition
1	15 November 2000	Stadio delle Alpi, Turin, Italy	England	1–0	1–0	Friendly

== Managerial statistics ==
As of match played 21 November 2026

Managerial record by team and tenure
Team	Nat.	From	To	Record							
Team	Nat.	From	To	G	W	D	L	GF	GA	GD	Win %
Sion	(Switzerland)	25 February 2013	13 May 2013	12	3	4	5	10	15	−5	25.00
Palermo	(Italy)	19 June 2013	25 September 2013	8	3	1	4	10	9	+1	37.50
OFI	(Greece)	5 June 2014	30 December 2014	17	5	3	9	11	24	−13	29.41
Pisa	(Italy)	20 August 2015	26 May 2017	86	28	35	23	81	72	+9	32.56
Milan	(Italy)	28 November 2017	28 May 2019	83	40	23	20	117	82	+35	48.19
Napoli	(Italy)	11 December 2019	23 May 2021	81	46	13	22	147	93	+54	56.79
Valencia	(Spain)	9 June 2022	30 January 2023	22	7	6	9	34	25	+9	31.82
Marseille	(France)	27 September 2023	19 February 2024	24	9	9	6	37	26	+11	37.50
Hajduk Split	(Croatia)	12 June 2024	5 June 2025	43	20	14	9	59	38	+21	46.51
Italy	(Italy)	15 June 2025	3 April 2026	8	6	1	1	22	10	+12	75.00
Lazio	(Italy)	23 June 2026	present	13	10	2	1	28	11	+17	76.92
Total				397	177	111	109	556	405	+151	44.58

== Honours ==
=== Player ===
Perugia Youth

- Trofeo Giacinto Facchetti: 1995–96

AC Milan

- Serie A: 2003–04, 2010–11
- Coppa Italia: 2002–03
- Supercoppa Italiana: 2004, 2011
- UEFA Champions League: 2002–03, 2006–07
- UEFA Super Cup: 2003, 2007
- FIFA Club World Cup: 2007

Italy U21

- UEFA Under-21 European Championship: 2000

Italy

- FIFA World Cup: 2006

Individual

- FIFA World Cup All-Star Team: 2006
- Premio Nazionale Carriera Esemplare "Gaetano Scirea": 2012
- FIFPro World XI: Nominee 2005, 2006, 2007, 2008
- AC Milan Hall of Fame

Orders

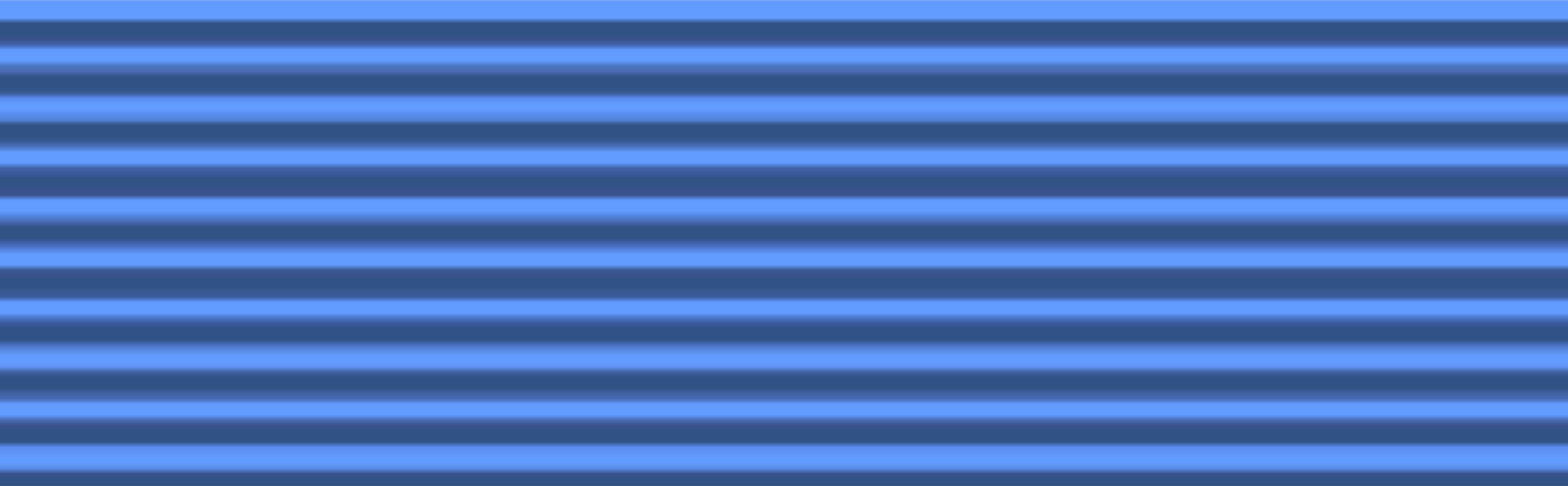
- CONI: Golden Collar of Sports Merit: 2006

- 4th Class / Officer: Ufficiale Ordine al Merito della Repubblica Italiana: 2006

=== Manager ===
Napoli

- Coppa Italia: 2019–20
