= Michael Boireau =

American football player (born 1978)

No. 92
- Position: Defensive end

Personal information
- Born: July 24, 1978 (age 48); Miami, Florida, U.S.

Career information
- High school: North Miami Beach (Miami)
- College: Northeast Mississippi (1996–1997); Miami (FL) (1998–1999)
- NFL draft: 2000: 2nd round, 56th overall pick

Career history
- Minnesota Vikings (2000–2001); Ottawa Renegades (2002); Cleveland Browns (2003)*
- * Offseason or practice squad member only

Michael Innocent Boireau (born July 24, 1978) is an American former professional football player who was a defensive end in the National Football League (NFL) and Canadian Football League (CFL). He played college football for the Northeast Mississippi Tigers and Miami Hurricanes. Boireau was selected by the Vikings in the second round of the 2000 NFL draft. He was also a member of the Cleveland Browns.

Boireau had a rare neuromuscular disorder called ocular myasthenia gravis. As a result of this condition and other injuries, he never played a down in a regular season NFL game. However, he did play a professional season for the Ottawa Renegades of the CFL in 2002.

== Early life ==
Michael Innocent Boireau was born on July 24, 1978, in Miami, Florida. He attended North Miami Beach High School in Miami. He recorded 70 tackles and 10 sacks his senior year, earning second-team all-state honors.

== College career ==
=== Northeast Mississippi ===
Boireau played junior college football for the Northeast Mississippi Tigers from 1996 to 1997. He accumulated 109 tackles, 8.5 sacks, seven forced fumbles, and four fumble recoveries his sophomore season in 1997.

=== Miami (FL) ===
Boireau transferred to play for the Miami Hurricanes from 1998 to 1999 and was a two-year letterman. He played in nine games, starting three, in 1998, splitting time with Quincy Hipps at left defensive end. Boireau totaled 21 tackles, one sack, and one fumble recovery that season. He also missed two games due to injury.

He started every game his senior year in 1999, recording 62 tackles, 3.5 sacks, one pass breakup and one fumble recovery. He was invited to play in the Hula Bowl and East-West Shrine Game following his senior season. Boireau was a business management major at Miami.

== Professional career ==
=== Minnesota Vikings ===
Boireau was selected by the Minnesota Vikings in the second round, with the 56th overall pick, of the 2000 NFL draft. He officially signed with the team on July 21. He did not play in any games in 2000 due to hand and knee injuries, and was placed on injured reserve on October 4, 2000.

Boireau was placed on the reserve/non-football illness list on July 30, 2001. On July 31, it was reported that he would be out for the season due to a recent relapse of a rare neuromuscular disorder called ocular myasthenia gravis. He was later released by the Vikings on February 21, 2002.

=== Ottawa Renegades ===
Boireau dressed in 13 games for the Ottawa Renegades of the Canadian Football League in 2002, recording 20 defensive tackles, two special teams tackles, three sacks, and two pass breakups.

=== Cleveland Browns ===
He signed with the Cleveland Browns on February 13, 2003. He was released on August 25, 2003.
