= Bienfang's test =

Clinical test used in the diagnosis of ocular myasthenia gravis

- Purpose: diagnosis of ocular myasthenia gravis

Bienfang's test is a clinical test used in the diagnosis of ocular myasthenia gravis. It is used in conjunction with other examination techniques such as Cogan's lid twitch test or enhancement of blepharoptosis from prolonged upward gaze. It is a simple, quick, and non-invasive test for ocular myasthenia gravis that can be performed not only by ophthalmologists or neurologists, but also by other physicians evaluating patients with ptosis, diplopia, or other symptoms of myasthenia gravis.

== Background ==
Myasthenia gravis is an autoimmune disease involving the neuromuscular junction leading to skeletal muscle weakness and fatigability. In ocular myasthenia gravis (OMG), the symptoms are confined to the extraocular and eyelid muscles. Patients most commonly experience ptosis caused by fatigue of levator palpebrae superioris and/or diplopia due to weakness of extraocular muscles. These symptoms are generally characterized by diurnal fluctuation, worsening with increased use of the eyes and improving with rest. Bienfang's test is indicated for patients who are suspected of having OMG. The test was first described by Don Bienfang, a neuro-ophthalmologist at Harvard Medical School.

== Clinical use and interpretation ==
To perform Bienfang's test, the examiner should ensure that the patient is seated comfortably with head and eyes in primary gaze. The examiner is positioned 2–3 feet in front of the patient's face to allow for clear observation of the patient's eyes. The patient is instructed to tightly squeeze his or her eyelids shut for five to ten seconds. This not only relaxes the levator palpebrae superioris but actively inhibits it. Simultaneously, it fatigues the orbicularis oculi. The patient then opens his or her eyes and fixates on a target directly ahead, maintaining primary gaze. Hence, the balance between these two opposing muscles may be shifted to a higher lid position.

A positive test is defined by excessive upward excursion followed by downward drift of the upper eyelid immediately after the eye opens, in similar fashion to Cogan's lid twitch sign. The test is negative if the upper eyelid position remains stable when the eye opens. A positive test is consistent with a diagnosis of OMG. The test may be positive in either ptotic or non-ptotic OMG. The test should be negative in patients with ptosis or diplopia of other etiologies.

Bienfang's test can help differentiate OMG from other causes of ptosis. For example, although most cases of acquired ptosis in older adults are due to dehiscence of the levator aponeurosis, OMG, which can affect the elderly, cannot be entirely ruled out. In such cases, Bienfang's test can be useful.

Bienfang's test is probably more sensitive than Cogan's lid twitch (CLT) test, which may have limited sensitivity and specificity. The forceful closure of the eyelids in Bienfang's test may allow for both enhanced rest of the levator muscle and increased fatigue of the orbicularis oculi compared to the sustained downgaze employed in the CLT. A more noticeable overshoot or twitch of the upper eyelid may therefore be observed when the eye is opened. Bienfang's test can therefore aid in the detection of mild or subtle cases of OMG, whereas the CLT test may only be positive in individuals with more pronounced disease.

== See also ==
- Ocular myasthenia
- Myasthenia gravis
