= 1997–98 UEFA Champions League =

European football tournament

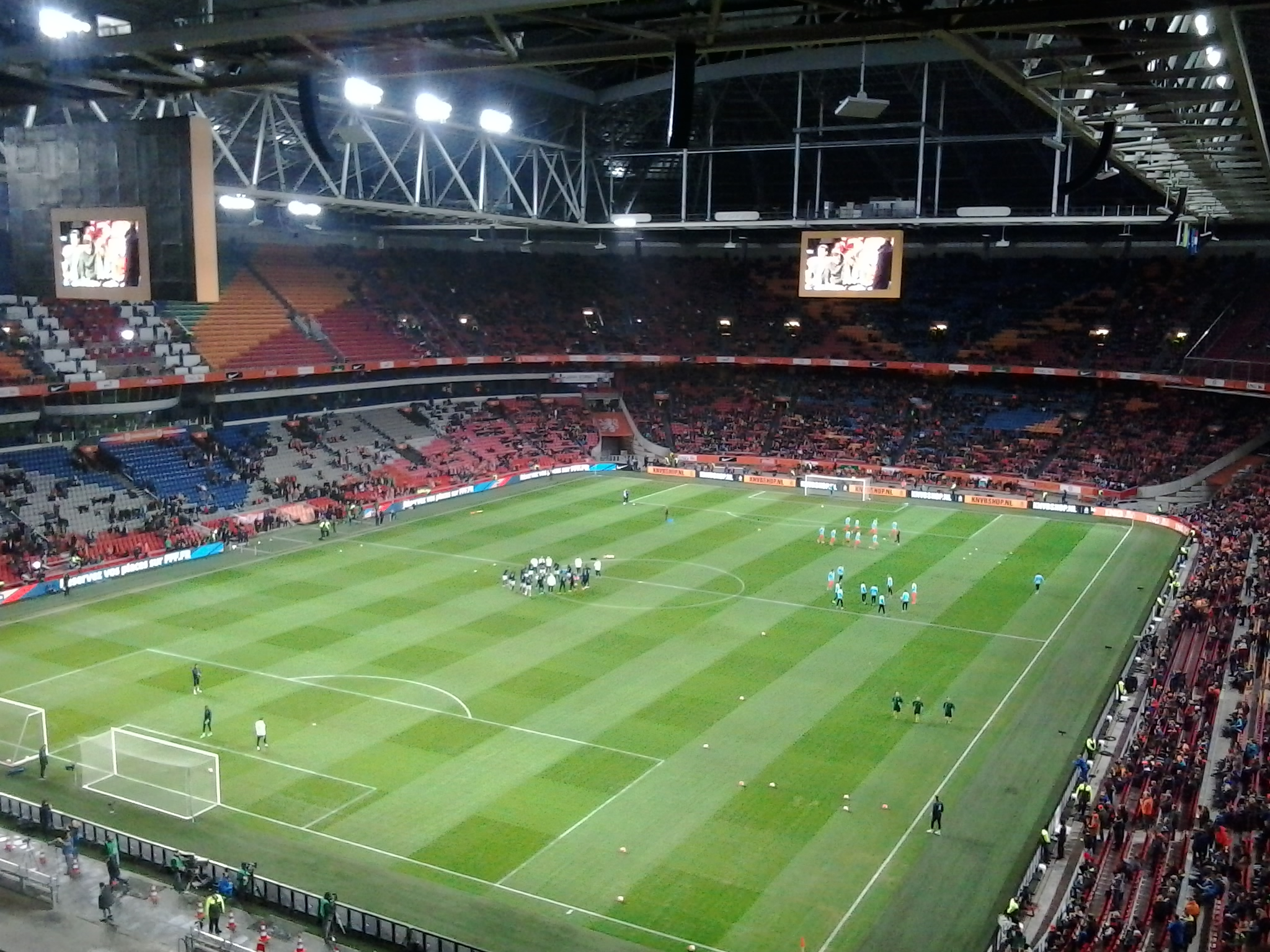
- The Amsterdam Arena held the final

Tournament details
- Dates: Qualifying: 23 July – 27 August 1997; Competition proper: 17 September 1997 – 20 May 1998
- Teams: Competition proper: 24; Total: 55

Final positions
- Champions: (Spain) Real Madrid (7th title)
- Runners-up: (Italy) Juventus

Tournament statistics
- Matches played: 85
- Goals scored: 239 (2.81 per match)
- Attendance: 2,868,568 (33,748 per match)
- Top scorer(s): Alessandro Del Piero (Juventus); 10 goals

The 1997–98 UEFA Champions League was the 43rd season of the UEFA Champions League, UEFA's premier club football tournament, and the sixth since its re-branding from the "European Champion Clubs' Cup" or "European Cup". The tournament was won by Real Madrid, winning for the first time in 32 years, beating Juventus 1-0, who were playing in a third consecutive final. It started a run of three victories in five seasons for the Spanish club.

This season was the first to have six groups, instead of previous four, which meant that only two group runners-up qualified for the quarter-finals as opposed to all the second-placed teams. It was also the first to have two qualifying rounds instead of just one. After three years of entering the UEFA Cup, champions of smaller nations returned to the Champions League. For the first time, the runners-up of eight domestic leagues entered into the competition. With Borussia Dortmund being the title holders but finishing third in their domestic league the previous season, Germany became the first association to provide three teams to the premier European competition.

Borussia Dortmund were the defending champions, but were eliminated in the semi-finals by eventual winners Real Madrid.

Armenia, Azerbaijan, Slovakia and the FY Republic of Macedonia all entered their champions for the first time, while the champion of Yugoslavia returned to this competition for the first time since 1991–92 season after the UN ban was lifted.

== Association team allocation ==
Number of teams per country as well as the starting round for each club and seeding were based on UEFA association coefficients.

- Associations ranked 1–8 each have two participants
- Associations ranked 9–48 each have one participant (except Liechtenstein and Albania)

=== Association ranking ===
For the 1997–98 UEFA Champions League, the associations were allocated places according to their 1997 UEFA association coefficients, which took into account their performance in European competitions from 1992–93 to 1996–97.

Apart from the allocation based on the association coefficients, an association could have an additional team participating in the Champions League, as noted below:

- (TH) – Additional berth for UEFA Champions League title holders

Association ranking for 1997–98 UEFA Champions League

Rank	Association	Coeff.	Teams	Notes
1	Italy	60.735	2	
2	Spain	46.532	2	
3	France	45.733	2	
4	Germany	43.949	2	+1 (TH)
5	Netherlands	36.350	2	
6	Portugal	34.800	2	
7	England	30.816	2	
8	Turkey	25.000	2	
9	Greece	25.000	1	
10	Austria	24.950	1	
11	Russia	24.866	1	
12	Belgium	24.400	1	
13	Denmark	22.950	1	
14	Sweden	22.750	1	
15	Norway	22.249	1	
16	Czech Republic	21.666	1	
17	Switzerland	21.500	1	

Rank	Association	Coeff.	Teams	Notes
18	Poland	19.500	1	
19	Scotland	18.800	1	
20	Romania	18.650	1	
21	Croatia	18.500	1	
22	Ukraine	17.998	1	
23	Cyprus	16.665	1	
24	Israel	16.416	1	
25	Hungary	16.249	1	
26	Georgia	16.000	1	
27	Slovakia	15.999	1	
28	Latvia	13.832	1	
29	Slovenia	12.998	1	
30	Finland	12.082	1	
31	Belarus	11.500	1	
32	Iceland	10.999	1	
33	Bulgaria	10.666	1	
34	Macedonia	7.333		

Rank	Association	Coeff.	Teams	Notes
35	Lithuania	6.000	1	
36	Moldova	6.000	1	
37	Northern Ireland	5.332	1	
38	Liechtenstein	5.000	0	
39	Wales	4.999	1	
40	FR Yugoslavia	4.750	1	
41	Estonia	4.666	1	
42	Malta	4.664	1	
43	Republic of Ireland	4.331	1	
44	Armenia	4.166	1	
45	Luxembourg	3.666	1	
46	Faroe Islands	3.000	1	
47	Albania	2.666	0	
48	Azerbaijan	1.833	1	
49	Andorra	0.000	0	
50	San Marino	0.000	0	

=== Distribution ===
	Teams entering in this round	Teams advancing from previous round
First qualifying round (30 teams)	30 champions from associations 17–48 (except Liechtenstein and Albania)	
Second qualifying round (32 teams)	9 champions from associations 8–16; 8 runners-up from associations 1–8	15 winners from the first qualifying round
Group stage (24 teams)	Champions League title holders (Borussia Dortmund); 7 champions from associations 1–7	16 winners from the second qualifying round
Knockout phase (8 teams)		6 group winners from the group stage; 2 best-ranked group runners-up from the group stage

=== Teams ===
55 teams entered the competition: the national champions of each of the top 48 nations in the UEFA coefficient rankings (except Liechtenstein and Albania), plus the runners-up from each of the top eight nations and UEFA Champions League holders, Borussia Dortmund. The national champions of the associations ranked 1–7 (Italy, Spain, France, Germany, Netherlands, Portugal and England), plus the title holders, all received a bye to the group stage, while the national champions of the associations ranked 8–16 and the runners-up of the associations ranked 1–8 all entered in the second qualifying round. The remaining national champions from the associations ranked 17–48 entered in the first qualifying round.

Group stage
(Germany) Borussia Dortmund (TH)	(Spain) Real Madrid (1st)	(Germany) Bayern Munich (1st)	(Portugal) Porto (1st)
(Italy) Juventus (1st)	(France) Monaco (1st)	(Netherlands) PSV Eindhoven (1st)	(England) Manchester United (1st)
Second qualifying round
(Italy) Parma (2nd)	(Portugal) Sporting CP (2nd)	(Greece) Olympiacos (1st)	(Denmark) Brøndby (1st)
(Spain) Barcelona (2nd)	(England) Newcastle United (2nd)	(Austria) Wüstenrot Salzburg (1st)	(Sweden) IFK Göteborg (1st)
(France) Paris Saint-Germain (2nd)	(Turkey) Galatasaray (1st)	(Russia) Spartak Moscow (1st)	(Norway) Rosenborg (1st)
(Germany) Bayer Leverkusen (2nd)	(Turkey) Beşiktaş (2nd)	(Belgium) Lierse (1st)	(Czech Republic) Sparta Prague (1st)
(Netherlands) Feyenoord (2nd)			
First qualifying round
(Switzerland) Sion (1st)	(Hungary) MTK (1st)	(Bulgaria) CSKA Sofia (1st)	(Estonia) Lantana (1st)
(Poland) Widzew Łódź (1st)	(Georgia (country)) Dinamo Tbilisi (1st)	(North Macedonia) Sileks (1st)	(Malta) Valletta (1st)
(Scotland) Rangers (1st)	(Slovakia) Košice (1st)	(Lithuania) Kareda (1st)	(Republic of Ireland) Derry City (1st)
(Romania) Steaua București (1st)	(Latvia) Skonto (1st)	(Moldova) Constructorul Chișinău (1st)	(Armenia) Pyunik (1st)
Croatia Zagreb (1st)	(Slovenia) Maribor (1st)	(Northern Ireland) Crusaders (1st)	(Luxembourg) Jeunesse Esch (1st)
(Ukraine) Dynamo Kyiv (1st)	(Finland) Jazz (1st)	(Wales) Barry Town (1st)	(Faroe Islands) GÍ (1st)
(Cyprus) Anorthosis Famagusta (1st)	(Belarus) MPKC Mozyr (1st)	(Federal Republic of Yugoslavia) Partizan (1st)	(Azerbaijan) Neftçi (1st)
(Israel) Beitar Jerusalem (1st)	(Iceland) ÍA (1st)		

Notes

1. Albania (ALB): Clubs from Albania were not admitted to UEFA competitions as 1996–97 Albanian Superliga was suspended for several months due to the 1997 Albanian civil unrest and eventually ended in mid-August 1997 (won by Tirana), past the UEFA deadline.

== Round and draw dates ==
The schedule of the competition was as follows (all draws were held in Geneva, Switzerland, unless stated otherwise).

Phase	Round	Draw date	First leg	Second leg
Qualifying	First qualifying round	9 July 1997	23 July 1997	30 July 1997
Qualifying	Second qualifying round	9 July 1997	13 August 1997	27 August 1997
Group stage	Matchday 1	29 August 1997	17 September 1997	
Group stage	Matchday 2	29 August 1997	1 October 1997	
Group stage	Matchday 3	29 August 1997	22 October 1997	
Group stage	Matchday 4	29 August 1997	5 November 1997	
Group stage	Matchday 5	29 August 1997	26–27 November 1997	
Group stage	Matchday 6	29 August 1997	10 December 1997	
Knockout phase	Quarter-finals	17 December 1997	4 March 1998	18 March 1998
Knockout phase	Semi-finals	20 March 1998 (Lausanne)	1 April 1998	15 April 1998
Knockout phase	Final	20 March 1998 (Lausanne)	20 May 1998 at Amsterdam Arena, Amsterdam	

== Qualifying rounds ==
=== First qualifying round ===
Team 1	Agg.	Team 2	1st leg	2nd leg
Derry City (Republic of Ireland)	0–3	(Slovenia) Maribor	0–2	0–1
Pyunik (Armenia)	3–6	(Hungary) MTK	0–2	3–4
Crusaders (Northern Ireland)	2–8	(Georgia (country)) Dinamo Tbilisi	1–3	1–5
Košice (Slovakia)	4–0	(Iceland) ÍA	3–0	1–0
Partizan (Federal Republic of Yugoslavia)	1–5	Croatia Zagreb	1–0	0–5
Valletta (Malta)	1–2	(Latvia) Skonto	1–0	0–2
Sileks (North Macedonia)	1–3	(Israel) Beitar Jerusalem	1–0	0–3
Steaua București (Romania)	5–3	(Bulgaria) CSKA Sofia	3–3	2–0
Constructorul Chișinău (Moldova)	3–4	(Belarus) MPKC Mozyr	1–1	2–3
Lantana (Estonia)	0–3	(Finland) Jazz	0–2	0–1
GÍ (Faroe Islands)	0–11	(Scotland) Rangers	0–5	0–6
Neftçi (Azerbaijan)	0–10	(Poland) Widzew Łódź	0–2	0–8
Dynamo Kyiv (Ukraine)	6–0	(Wales) Barry Town	2–0	4–0
Sion (Switzerland)	5–0	(Luxembourg) Jeunesse Esch	4–0	1–0
Anorthosis Famagusta (Cyprus)	4–1	(Lithuania) Kareda	3–0	1–1

=== Second qualifying round ===
The losing teams qualified for the first round of the 1997–98 UEFA Cup.

Team 1	Agg.	Team 2	1st leg	2nd leg
Beşiktaş (Turkey)	3–1	(Slovenia) Maribor	0–0	3–1
MTK (Hungary)	1–4	(Norway) Rosenborg	0–1 (Note: The original first leg of the MTK v Rosenborg tie was abandoned in the 68th minute with MTK leading 3–2, and replayed from scratch a day later.)	1–3
Sion (Switzerland)	2–8	(Turkey) Galatasaray	1–4	1–4
Olympiacos (Greece)	7–2	(Belarus) MPKC Mozyr	5–0	2–2
Wüstenrot Salzburg (Austria)	0–3	(Czech Republic) Sparta Prague	0–0	0–3
IFK Göteborg (Sweden)	4–1	(Scotland) Rangers	3–0	1–1
Barcelona (Spain)	4–2	(Latvia) Skonto	3–2	1–0
Brøndby (Denmark)	3–4	(Ukraine) Dynamo Kyiv	2–4	1–0
Newcastle United (England)	4–3	Croatia Zagreb	2–1	2–2 (a.e.t.)
Feyenoord (Netherlands)	8–3	(Finland) Jazz	6–2	2–1
Bayer Leverkusen (Germany)	6–2	(Georgia (country)) Dinamo Tbilisi	6–1	0–1
Košice (Slovakia)	2–1	(Russia) Spartak Moscow	2–1	0–0
Steaua București (Romania)	3–5	(France) Paris Saint-Germain	3–0 (Note: The match was awarded to Steaua București after Paris Saint-Germain fielded an ineligible player.)	0–5
Widzew Łódź (Poland)	1–7	(Italy) Parma	1–3	0–4
Beitar Jerusalem (Israel)	0–3	(Portugal) Sporting CP	0–0	0–3
Anorthosis Famagusta (Cyprus)	2–3	(Belgium) Lierse	2–0	0–3

== Group stage ==
Location of teams of the 1997–98 UEFA Champions League group stage.
Brown: Group A; Red: Group B; Orange: Group C; Yellow: Group D; Green: Group E; Blue: Group F.
Location of Benelux teams in the 1997–98 UEFA Champions League group stage

Bayer Leverkusen, Beşiktaş, Košice, Feyenoord, Lierse, Newcastle United, Olympiacos, Parma, Sparta Prague (who already qualified for the 1991-92 European Cup group stage) and Sporting CP made their debut in the group stage. Košice lost all six of their group stage matches and thus became the first team to finish a Champions League group stage with no points. They were also first team from Slovakia to play in group stage.

=== Group A ===
Pos	Team	Pld	W	D	L	GF	GA	GD	Pts	Qualification	DOR	PRM	SPP	GAL
1	(Germany) Borussia Dortmund	6	5	0	1	14	3	+11	15	Advance to knockout stage	—	2–0	4–1	4–1
2	(Italy) Parma	6	2	3	1	6	5	+1	9		1–0	—	2–2	2–0
3	(Czech Republic) Sparta Prague	6	1	2	3	6	11	−5	5		0–3	0–0	—	3–0
4	(Turkey) Galatasaray	6	1	1	4	4	11	−7	4		0–1	1–1	2–0	—

Source: UEFA

=== Group B ===
Pos	Team	Pld	W	D	L	GF	GA	GD	Pts	Qualification	MUN	JUV	FEY	KOS
1	(England) Manchester United	6	5	0	1	14	5	+9	15	Advance to knockout stage	—	3–2	2–1	3–0
2	(Italy) Juventus	6	4	0	2	12	8	+4	12	Advance to knockout stage	1–0	—	5–1	3–2
3	(Netherlands) Feyenoord	6	3	0	3	8	10	−2	9		1–3	2–0	—	2–0
4	(Slovakia) Košice	6	0	0	6	2	13	−11	0		0–3	0–1	0–1	—

Source: UEFA

=== Group C ===
Pos	Team	Pld	W	D	L	GF	GA	GD	Pts	Qualification	DKV	PSV	NEW	BAR
1	(Ukraine) Dynamo Kyiv	6	3	2	1	13	6	+7	11	Advance to knockout stage	—	1–1	2–2	3–0
2	(Netherlands) PSV Eindhoven	6	2	3	1	9	8	+1	9		1–3	—	1–0	2–2
3	(England) Newcastle United	6	2	1	3	7	8	−1	7		2–0	0–2	—	3–2
4	(Spain) Barcelona	6	1	2	3	7	14	−7	5		0–4	2–2	1–0	—

Source: UEFA

=== Group D ===
Pos	Team	Pld	W	D	L	GF	GA	GD	Pts	Qualification	RMA	ROS	OLY	POR
1	(Spain) Real Madrid	6	4	1	1	15	4	+11	13	Advance to knockout stage	—	4–1	5–1	4–0
2	(Norway) Rosenborg	6	3	2	1	13	8	+5	11		2–0	—	5–1	2–0
3	(Greece) Olympiacos	6	1	2	3	6	14	−8	5		0–0	2–2	—	1–0
4	(Portugal) Porto	6	1	1	4	3	11	−8	4		0–2	1–1	2–1	—

Source: UEFA

=== Group E ===
Pos	Team	Pld	W	D	L	GF	GA	GD	Pts	Qualification	BAY	PAR	BES	GOT
1	(Germany) Bayern Munich	6	4	0	2	13	6	+7	12	Advance to knockout stage	—	5–1	2–0	0–1
2	(France) Paris Saint-Germain	6	4	0	2	11	10	+1	12		3–1	—	2–1	3–0
3	(Turkey) Beşiktaş	6	2	0	4	6	9	−3	6		0–2	3–1	—	1–0
4	(Sweden) IFK Göteborg	6	2	0	4	4	9	−5	6		1–3	0–1	2–1	—

Source: UEFA

=== Group F ===
Pos	Team	Pld	W	D	L	GF	GA	GD	Pts	Qualification	MON	LEV	SPO	LIE
1	(France) Monaco	6	4	1	1	15	8	+7	13	Advance to knockout stage	—	4–0	3–2	5–1
2	(Germany) Bayer Leverkusen	6	4	1	1	11	7	+4	13	Advance to knockout stage	2–2	—	4–1	1–0
3	(Portugal) Sporting CP	6	2	1	3	9	11	−2	7		3–0	0–2	—	2–1
4	(Belgium) Lierse	6	0	1	5	3	12	−9	1		0–1	0–2	1–1	—

Source: UEFA

=== Ranking of second-placed teams ===
Pos	Grp	Team	Pld	W	D	L	GF	GA	GD	Pts	Qualification
1	F	(Germany) Bayer Leverkusen	6	4	1	1	11	7	+4	13	Advance to knockout stage
2	B	(Italy) Juventus	6	4	0	2	12	8	+4	12	Advance to knockout stage
3	E	(France) Paris Saint-Germain	6	4	0	2	11	10	+1	12	
4	D	(Norway) Rosenborg	6	3	2	1	13	8	+5	11	
5	C	(Netherlands) PSV Eindhoven	6	2	3	1	9	8	+1	9	
6	A	(Italy) Parma	6	2	3	1	6	5	+1	9	

Source: RSSSF
Rules for classification: 1) Points; 2) Goal difference; 3) Goals scored; 4) Away goals scored; 5) Association coefficient; 6) Club coefficient.

== Knockout stage ==
=== Bracket ===
Quarter-finals
(Italy) Juventus	1	4	5
(Ukraine) Dynamo Kyiv	1	1	2
(France) Monaco (a)	0	1	1
(England) Manchester United	0	1	1
(Germany) Bayer Leverkusen	1	0	1
(Spain) Real Madrid	1	3	4
(Germany) Bayern Munich	0	0	0
(Germany) Borussia Dortmund (a.e.t.)	0	1	1

Semi-finals
(Italy) Juventus	4	2	6
(France) Monaco	1	3	4
(Spain) Real Madrid	2	0	2
(Germany) Borussia Dortmund	0	0	0

Final
20 May – Amsterdam
(Italy) Juventus	0
(Spain) Real Madrid	1

=== Quarter-finals ===
The quarter-final between German clubs Bayern Munich and Borussia Dortmund marked the first meeting of two teams from the same country in the Champions League (including the European Cup era, the first game between teams from the same country occurred in 1958–59). With Bayer Leverkusen also having qualified, it marked the first time three clubs from the same nation played in the knockout phase.

Team 1	Agg.	Team 2	1st leg	2nd leg
Bayer Leverkusen (Germany)	1–4	(Spain) Real Madrid	1–1	0–3
Bayern Munich (Germany)	0–1	(Germany) Borussia Dortmund	0–0	0–1 (a.e.t.)
Juventus (Italy)	5–2	(Ukraine) Dynamo Kyiv	1–1	4–1
Monaco (France)	1–1 (a)	(England) Manchester United	0–0	1–1

=== Semi-finals ===
Team 1	Agg.	Team 2	1st leg	2nd leg
Real Madrid (Spain)	2–0	(Germany) Borussia Dortmund	2–0	0–0
Juventus (Italy)	6–4	(France) Monaco	4–1	2–3

=== Final ===
The final was played on 20 May 1998 at the Amsterdam Arena in Amsterdam, Netherlands.

20 May 1998
20:45 UTC+2

Juventus (Italy)	0–1	(Spain) Real Madrid
	Report	Mijatović 66'

Amsterdam Arena, Amsterdam
Attendance: 48,500
Referee: Hellmut Krug (Germany)

== Top goalscorers ==
Rank	Name	Team	Goals
1	(Italy) Alessandro Del Piero	(Italy) Juventus	10
2	(France) Thierry Henry	(France) Monaco	7
3	(Italy) Filippo Inzaghi	(Italy) Juventus	6
3	(Ukraine) Serhiy Rebrov	(Ukraine) Dynamo Kyiv	6
5	(England) Andy Cole	(England) Manchester United	5
5	(Ukraine) Andriy Shevchenko	(Ukraine) Dynamo Kyiv	5
7	(Germany) Stefan Beinlich	(Germany) Bayer Leverkusen	4
7	(Turkey) Oktay Derelioğlu	(Turkey) Beşiktaş	4
7	(Brazil) Emerson	(Germany) Bayer Leverkusen	4
7	(Nigeria) Victor Ikpeba	(France) Monaco	4
7	(Germany) Carsten Jancker	(Germany) Bayern Munich	4
7	(Spain) Fernando Morientes	(Spain) Real Madrid	4
7	(Norway) Sigurd Rushfeldt	(Norway) Rosenborg	4
7	(Croatia) Davor Šuker	(Spain) Real Madrid	4
7	(France) David Trezeguet	(France) Monaco	4
7	(Switzerland) Stéphane Chapuisat	(Germany) Borussia Dortmund	4
7	(Norway) Harald Brattbakk	(Norway) Rosenborg	4
7	(Norway) Roar Strand	(Norway) Rosenborg	4

== See also ==
- 1997 UEFA Intertoto Cup
- 1997–98 UEFA Cup
- 1997–98 UEFA Cup Winners' Cup
