= Luigi Riccio (footballer) =

Italian footballer and manager

Personal information
- Full name: Luigi Riccio
- Date of birth: 28 December 1977 (age 48)
- Place of birth: Naples, Italy
- Height: 1.76 m (5 ft 9 in)
- Position: Midfielder

Youth career
- –1994: Giarre
- 1994–1997: Perugia

Senior career*
Years	Team	Apps	(Gls)
1994	Giarre	1	(0)
1996–1997	Perugia	0	(0)
1997–2000	Rangers	1	(0)
1999	→ Beveren (loan)	5	(0)
2000	Pistoiese	15	(1)
2001–2002	Ternana	34	(1)
2002	→ Ancona (loan)	16	(0)
2002–2009	Piacenza	252	(19)
2009–2011	Sassuolo	68	(4)
Total		392	(25)

Managerial career
- 2012–2013: Sion (assistant)
- 2013: Sion (caretaker)
- 2013–2014: Palermo (assistant)
- 2014–2015: OFI (assistant)
- 2015–2017: Pisa (assistant)
- 2017: AC Milan Primavera (assistant)
- 2017–2019: AC Milan (assistant)
- 2019–2021: Napoli (assistant)
- 2022–2023: Valencia (assistant)
- 2023–2024: Marseille (assistant)
- * Club domestic league appearances and goals

Luigi "Gigi" Riccio (born 28 December 1977) is an Italian football coach and former midfielder.

== Career ==
Riccio began his career as a professional in Giarre, before moving to Perugia. In 1997, he had a trial spell at Everton before moving to Rangers in 1998. He made only one appearance as a substitute during a league match against Motherwell on 15 May 1999. Riccio was also an unused substitute as Rangers memorably won the league away at rivals Celtic in May 1999. He left for Belgian club Beveren in 1999.

He returned to Italy in 2000 with Pistoiese, before moving on to Ternana, Ancona and finally Piacenza, where he played and has been captain. He played his last match on 29 May 2011 for Sassuolo.

In the summer of 2012, he followed his friend Gennaro Gattuso (which he knew from his time at the Rangers) to the Swiss club Sion. While Gattuso was signed as a player, Riccio was named as the assistant manager.

On 19 June 2013, Riccio again followed Gattuso, this time to Italian Serie B club Palermo. Gattuso was named as the new manager, with Gattuso appointing Riccio as his assistant. Riccio followed Gattuso to OFI, Pisa, Milan Primavera and A.C. Milan's first team. In December 2019, the duo was hired at Napoli, replacing Carlo Ancelotti.

== Honours ==
=== Player ===
Rangers

- Scottish Premier League: 1998–99
- Scottish Cup: 1998–99
- Scottish League Cup: 1998–99
