= Marco Negri =

Italian footballer

Personal information
- Full name: Marco Paulo Negri
- Date of birth: 27 October 1970 (age 56)
- Place of birth: Milan, Italy
- Height: 1.80 m (5 ft 11 in)
- Position: Striker

Youth career
- 1982–1984: A.S.D. Unione Fincantieri Monfalcone
- 1984–1988: Udinese

Senior career*
Years	Team	Apps	(Gls)
1988–1991	Udinese	8	(0)
1989–1990	→ Novara (loan)	27	(0)
1991–1993	Ternana	33	(5)
1993–1995	Cosenza	58	(23)
1994	→ Bologna (loan)	24	(8)
1995–1997	Perugia	61	(33)
1997–2001	Rangers	30	(32)
1999	→ Vicenza (loan)	9	(1)
2001–2002	Bologna	3	(0)
2002	Cagliari	4	(2)
2002–2004	Livorno	20	(8)
2004–2005	Perugia	3	(0)
Total		280	(112)
- * Club domestic league appearances and goals

Marco Negri (born 27 October 1970) is an Italian former footballer who played as a striker for Udinese, Novara, Ternana, Cosenza, Perugia, Rangers, Vicenza, Cagliari, Bologna and Livorno.

== Career ==
=== Early career in Italy and breakthrough with Perugia ===
Negri was born in Milan on 27 October 1970. He began his career during the 1988–89 season with Udinese, making three appearances, and later also made five more for the club during the 1990–91 season. He spent the 1989–90 Serie C2 season with Novara, collecting 27 appearances. During the 1991–92 season, he won the Serie C1 title with Ternana, scoring five goals in 32 appearances, and helped the club earn promotion to Serie B. He spent the following season with Cosenza, however, managing only four goals in 25 appearances. In 1993, he joined Bologna in Serie C1, scoring 8 goals in 24 appearances, before later returning to Cosenza the following year, where he experienced his best season yet, scoring 19 goals in 34 appearances.

He later made his breakthrough with Perugia during the 1995–96 Serie B season, scoring 18 goals and helping the club achieve promotion to the Italian top flight. He made his Serie A debut the following season, also scoring his first goal in the top flight, in a 1–0 home win over Sampdoria. Despite his impressive tally of 15 goals in the league for the club during the 1996–97 season, he could not prevent the side from facing relegation, however, although his performances caught the attention of other clubs.

=== Rangers ===
Rangers manager Walter Smith signed Negri from Perugia for £3.5 million in 1997. He was rewarded with instant success, as Negri scored 23 goals in his first ten league games, including all five goals in a 5–1 win over Dundee United in the second league game of the season on 23 August 1997 at Ibrox Stadium, as well as his side's only goal in a 1–1 draw against rivals Celtic at Celtic Park. His low-key celebrations were noteworthy – often he felt the need only to exchange a handshake with other players and showed little exuberance.

Negri easily topped the goalscoring charts in that first campaign, with 32 league goals. His scoring run was brought to an end on suffering a serious eye injury to his retina, attributed to a squash match with teammate Sergio Porrini. Back training after his eye injury, Negri suffered from further injuries. Following his return to action, he only scored twice and won two of his next 10 league games with the side, as Celtic prevented Rangers from winning a tenth consecutive league title. After that first season Negri only played three more first team games, and he sat out the whole of one campaign. Rangers then loaned him to Vicenza in 1999 and the striker returned to Ibrox injured. Eventually he was sold to his former club Bologna, in February 2001, having made only 40 appearances in all competitions for the Scottish side.

=== Later career ===
After his time with Bologna, Negri had a spell with Cagliari, and subsequently dropped down into Serie B with Livorno, scoring four goals in first three appearances, but they released him after only a few months following his declining performances. In 2004, the player had a trial at Derby County, although he was not offered a contract. He later returned to Perugia, but only made three appearances for the club in Serie B. He eventually retired in 2005 to dedicate himself to his family.
