= Ocular myasthenia =

- Specialty: Ophthalmology

Ocular myasthenia gravis (MG) is a disease of the neuromuscular junction resulting in hallmark variability in muscle weakness and fatigability. MG is an autoimmune disease where anomalous antibodies are produced against the naturally occurring acetylcholine receptors in voluntary muscles. MG may be limited to the muscles of the eye (ocular MG), leading to abrupt onset of weakness/fatigability of the eyelids or eye movement. MG may also involve other muscle groups (generalized MG).

== Signs and symptoms ==
Although these blocking antibodies may be confined to one of the larger muscles responsible for moving the face or appendages or for breathing, about 90% of MG patients eventually have eye involvement. The most common symptoms are double vision (diplopia) and eyelid drooping (ptosis), whereas the pupil is always spared. Diplopia occurs when MG affects a single extraocular muscle in one eye, limiting eye movement and leading to double vision when the eye is turned toward the affected muscle. Ptosis occurs when the levator palpebrae superioris (the muscle responsible for eyelid elevation) is affected on one or both sides, leading to eyelid drooping. Although these symptoms may not be readily apparent in well-rested patients, weakness can usually be induced with exercise of the commonly affected muscles (e.g. by having the patient look upward for about 60 seconds).

In 75% of MG cases, the initial manifestation is in the eye. Within 2 years, 80% of patients with ocular onset of MG will progress to involve other muscle groups, thereby developing generalized MG. If MG is confined to the ocular muscles for more than 3 years, there is a 94% likelihood that the symptoms will not worsen or generalize.

Aside from asymmetric ptosis (which becomes worse with fatigue, sustained upgaze, and at the end of the day) and variable limitation of extraocular muscles/diplopia, other clinical signs of ocular MG include gaze-evoked nystagmus (rapid, involuntary, oscillatory motion of the eyeball) and Cogan's lid twitch (upper lid twitch present when patient looks straight ahead after looking down for 10–15 seconds).

== Pathophysiology ==
Normally, muscle contraction is a result of electrical signals sent from the central nervous system to muscle fibers via nerve impulses. At the neuromuscular junction, this electrical message is converted into a chemical message as acetylcholine is released from nerve fibers and attaches to corresponding receptors on the muscle fiber.

In MG, antibodies are produced that block acetylcholine receptors, preventing the molecule from binding to the receptor and leading to a breakdown in communication between the nervous system and the muscle, resulting in muscle fatigue, and sometimes paralysis. Autoantibodies against acetylcholine receptors are detectable in 70–90% of patients with generalized MG, but only 50% in ocular MG.

=== Predilection for eye muscles ===
The precise reasons for the preferential involvement of eye muscles in MG is not well understood, but there are several lines of thought.

Functional hypotheses propose that although multiple muscles may be affected, a deficit may be more readily apparent in the eyes for several reasons. Slight weakness in a limb may be tolerated, but slight weakness in the extraocular muscles would lead to misalignment of the two eyes, even a small degree of which could lead to diplopia. Eyes may also be less able to adapt to variable weakness, because extraocular muscles use visual rather than proprioceptive (body position-sensing) cues for fine-tuning.

Immunologic hypotheses proposes that there may be differences in the antibodies in ocular MG versus generalized MG that may favor the muscles responsible for eye movement and eyelid elevation.

Physiologic hypotheses propose that it is the unique structure and function of extraocular muscles that predispose them to weakness in MG. Compared to extremity muscles, extraocular muscles are smaller, served by more nerve fibers, and are among the fastest contracting muscles in the body. This higher level of activity may predispose them to fatigue in MG. Additionally, some reports indicate that there may be fewer acetylcholine receptors in extraocular muscles versus limb muscles.

== Diagnosis ==
The variable course of MG may make the diagnosis difficult. In brief, the diagnosis of MG relies mostly on the patient's history and physical findings, with particular attention to neurologic, eye motility, and eyelid exams. Frequently, patients will describe experiencing alternating ptosis (lid droop in one eye that gets better, then is followed by ptosis in the other eye), as well as diplopia that worsens during the day (with increasing extraocular muscle fatigue).

A tensilon (edrophonium chloride) test can be used, which temporarily blocks the breakdown of acetylcholine, and briefly relieves weakness; however, false-negative results are common. Single-fiber electromyography can be used to electrically stimulate single muscle fibers to determine if there is muscle weakness present. The diagnosis of MG can also be confirmed with blood work that measures the amount of blocking antibody present, but only 70% of ocular MG patients have detectable antibody levels. Additional lab and image tests for commonly associated thyroid, thymus and autoimmune diseases are also advisable.

== Treatment ==
The prognosis tends to be good for patients with MG. It is often best not to treat mild cases of MG. Management necessitates avoidance of medications that can worsen neuromuscular transmission, such as aminoglycoside antibiotics, quinolone antibiotics, beta-blockers, chloroquine, anti-arrhythmics, calcium channel blockers, some anticonvulsants and intravenous iodinated contrast should be avoided.

MG is characteristically variable in course, with the frequency of diplopia and ptosis affected by environmental, emotional and physical factors such as bright sunlight, stress, viral illness, menstruation, pregnancy, etc. Spontaneous remission can occur in any patient and remain for years. In a study of the natural history of generalized MG among 168 patients (with an average follow-up of 12 years), 14% experienced complete remission.

Patients with mild-to-moderate ocular myasthenia are usually treated initially with oral anticholinesterase agents, Mestinon (pyridostigmine) being the most commonly employed. There have not been any randomized clinical trials conducted with these agents, and this treatment is often unsuccessful, particularly in resolving diplopia. Immunosuppressive therapy is then started and the agent of choice is usually prednisone. In a small controlled study this drug demonstrated greater efficacy than pyridostigmine. Steroid therapy is controversial, but in another study the results suggested that prednisone does decrease progression to generalized MG. There is no single recommended dosing regimen in light of the side effects commonly associated with chronic corticosteroid therapy, and the difficulty in weaning patients from steroids without exacerbation of symptoms. Response to prednisone therapy is variable.

Additionally, MG patients should be examined for thymomas, and if found, should undergo surgery to address this condition. A prophylactic thymectomy is controversial, but has been shown to be helpful in young MG patients with acute disease within 3 years of disease onset, in patients with enlarged thymus glands and for whom surgery is low-risk, and patients with generalized MG who are unresponsive to medical treatment.

The symptoms of ocular MG can also be addressed by non-medicinal means. Ptosis can be corrected with placement of crutches on eyeglasses and with ptosis tape to elevate eyelid droop. Diplopia can be addressed by occlusion with eye patching, frosted lens, occluding contact lens, or by simply placing opaque tape over a portion of eyeglasses. Also, plastic prisms (Fresnel prisms) can be attached to eyeglasses of a diplopic patient, allowing for alignment of vision from both eyes in the affected direction, but are often problematic if the degree of muscle weakness, and therefore ocular misalignment, fluctuates frequently.

== Epidemiology ==
In contrast to generalized MG, purely ocular MG occurs equally among females and males, has a higher incidence in persons of Korean descent, and is likely associated with thyroid disease, thymomas (20% incidence), and other autoimmune diseases such as scleroderma, systemic lupus erythematosus, rheumatoid arthritis, Hashimoto's thyroiditis, multiple sclerosis, and thyroid ophthalmopathy.
